= List of foods named after places =

Lists of foods named after places have been compiled by writers, sometimes on travel websites or food-oriented websites, as well as in books.

Since all of these names are words derived from place names, they are all toponyms. This article covers English language food toponyms which may have originated in English or other languages.

According to Delish.com, "[T]here's a rich history of naming foods after cities, towns, countries, and even the moon."

The following foods and drinks were named after places. Each non-obvious etymology is supported by a reference on the linked Wikipedia page. Food names are listed by country of the origin of the word, not necessarily where the food originated or was thought to have originated. Some foods are certified to originate in that region with a protected designation of origin (PDO).

== Africa ==
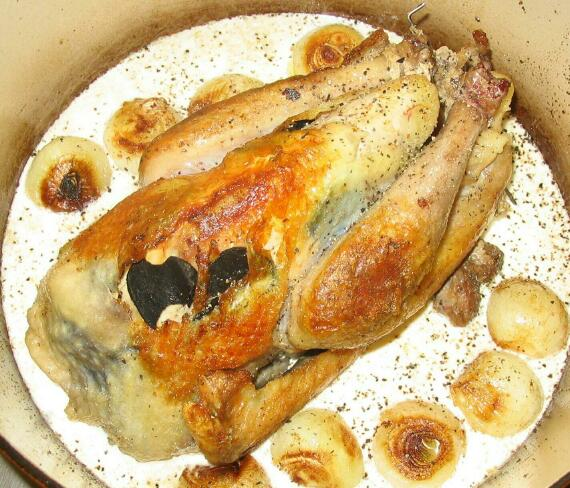
A cooked guinea hen

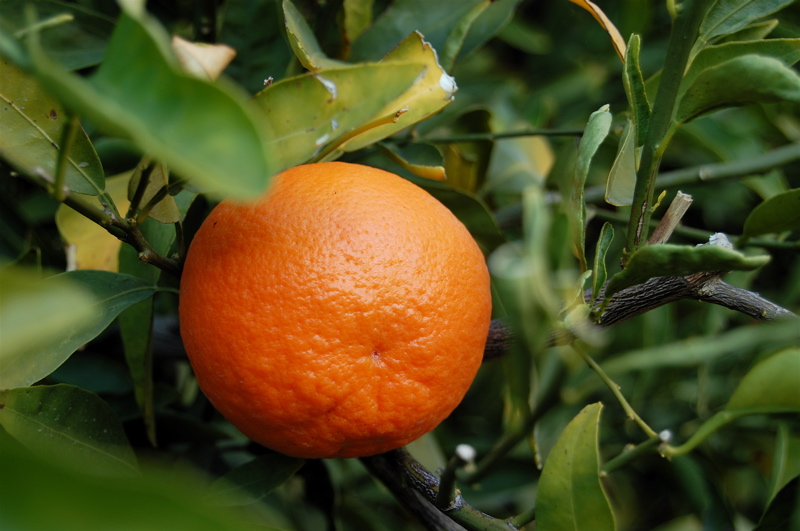
Tangerine

- African eggplant
- African pepper
- Bourbon vanilla — Île Bourbon, now the island of Réunion
- Canarian wrinkly potatoes — Canary Islands
- Egyptian onion — Egypt
- Gabon nut — Gabon
- Guinea grains or Guinea peppers — the Guinea region of the African West coast
- Guineafowl — the Guinea region
- Galinha à africana — "African-style chicken"
- Madagascar vanilla — Madagascar
- Moroccan citron — Morocco
- Muscat of Alexandria — the city of Alexandria, Egypt
- Niger seed — the Niger River
- Sauce Africaine — "African sauce"
- Tunisian tajine — Tunisia
- Tangerine (and therefore Tangelo and Tangor) — the city of Tangier, Morocco
- Tunis cake — British cake named after the city of Tunis, Tunisia

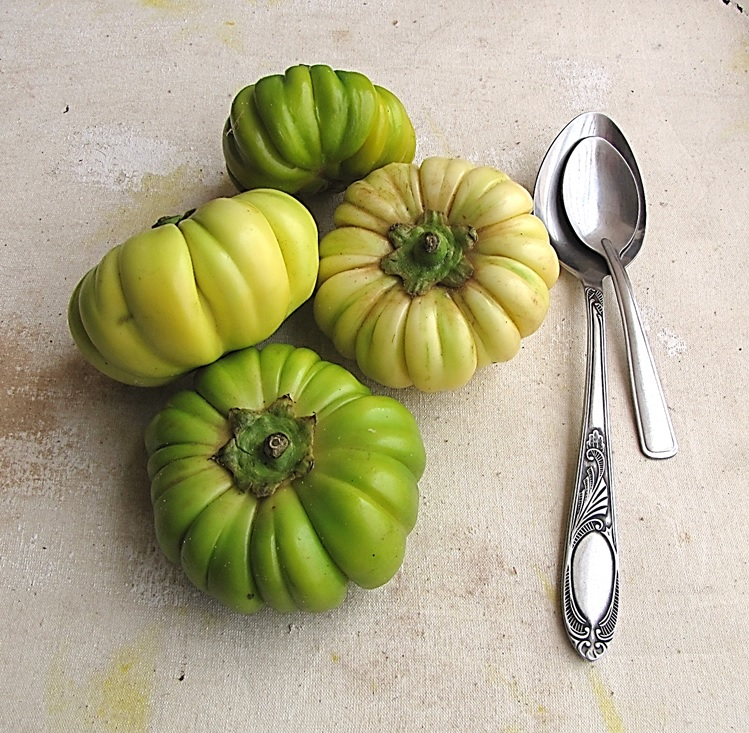
Ethiopian eggplant

=== Ethiopia ===
- Abyssinian tea (khat) — Abyssinia, the former name of Ethiopia
- Ethiopian banana
- Ethiopian cardamom
- Ethiopian eggplant
- Ethiopian mustard
- Ethiopian pepper

== Asia ==
- Asian pear

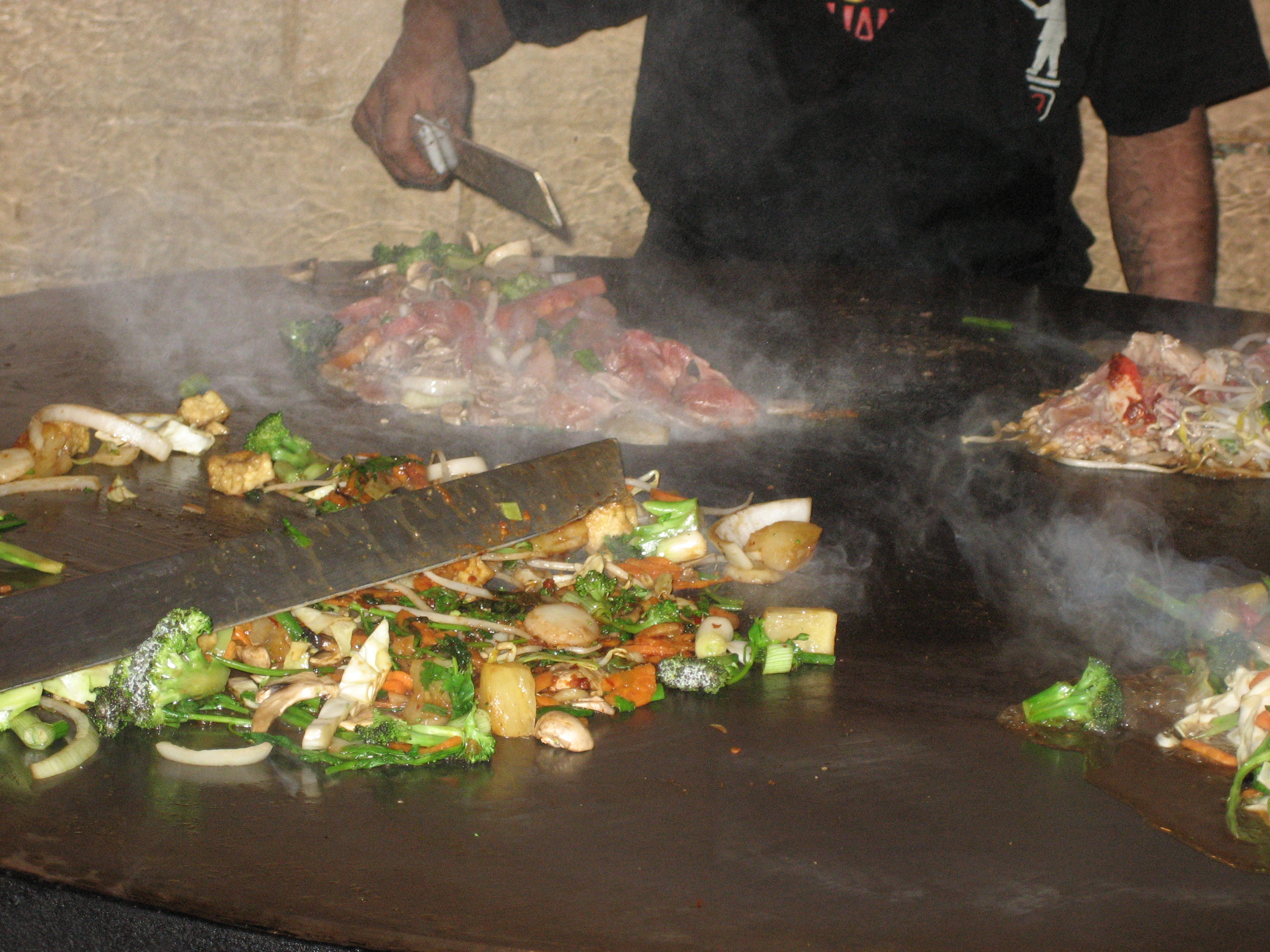
Mongolian barbecue

=== East Asia ===
- Mongolian barbecue— Mongolia, though originating from the Taiwanese cuisine
- Mongolian beef — named after Mongolian barbecue

==== Taiwan ====
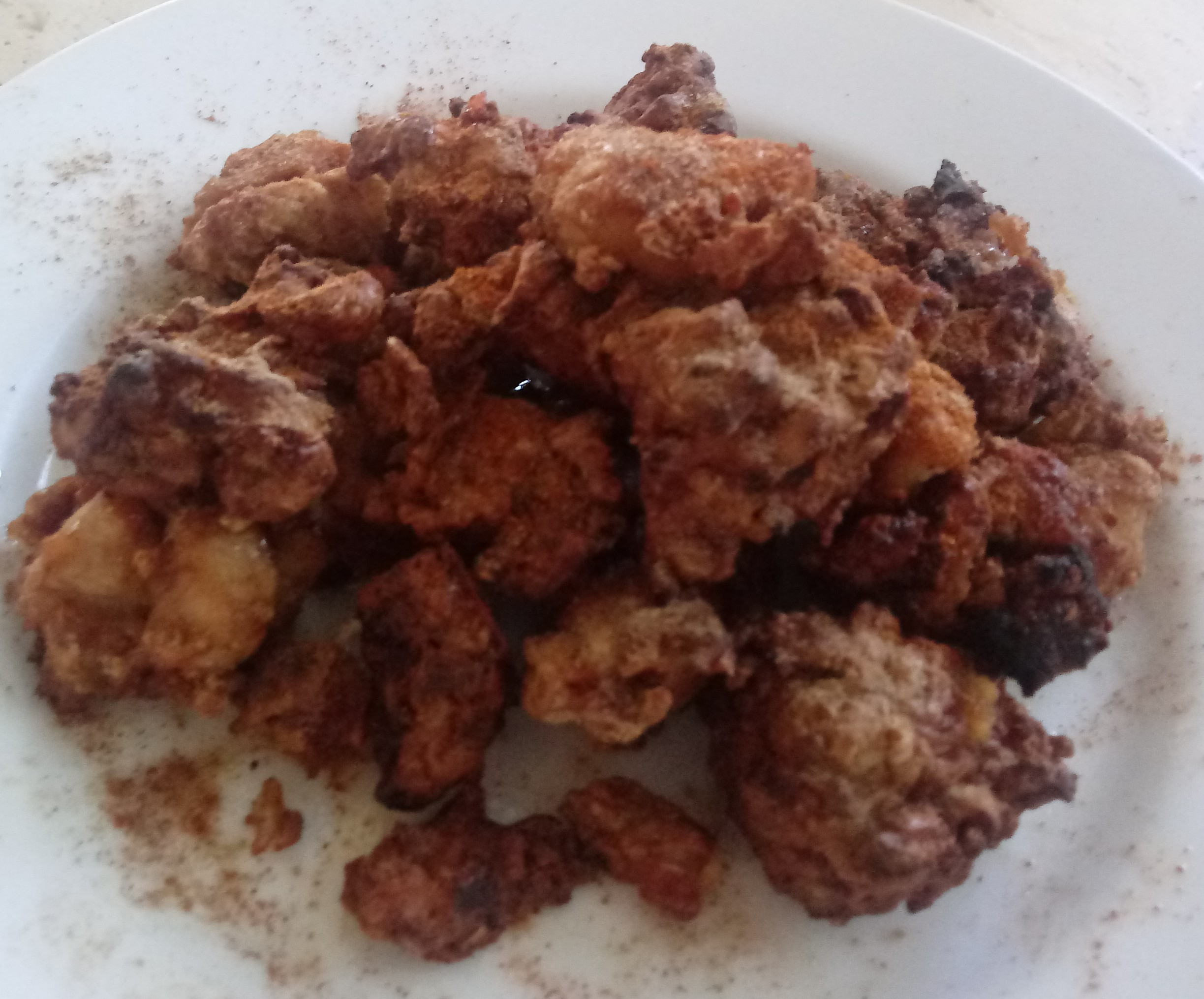
Taiwanese fried chicken

- Taiwanese fried chicken — Taiwan
- Taiwan tangerine

==== China ====
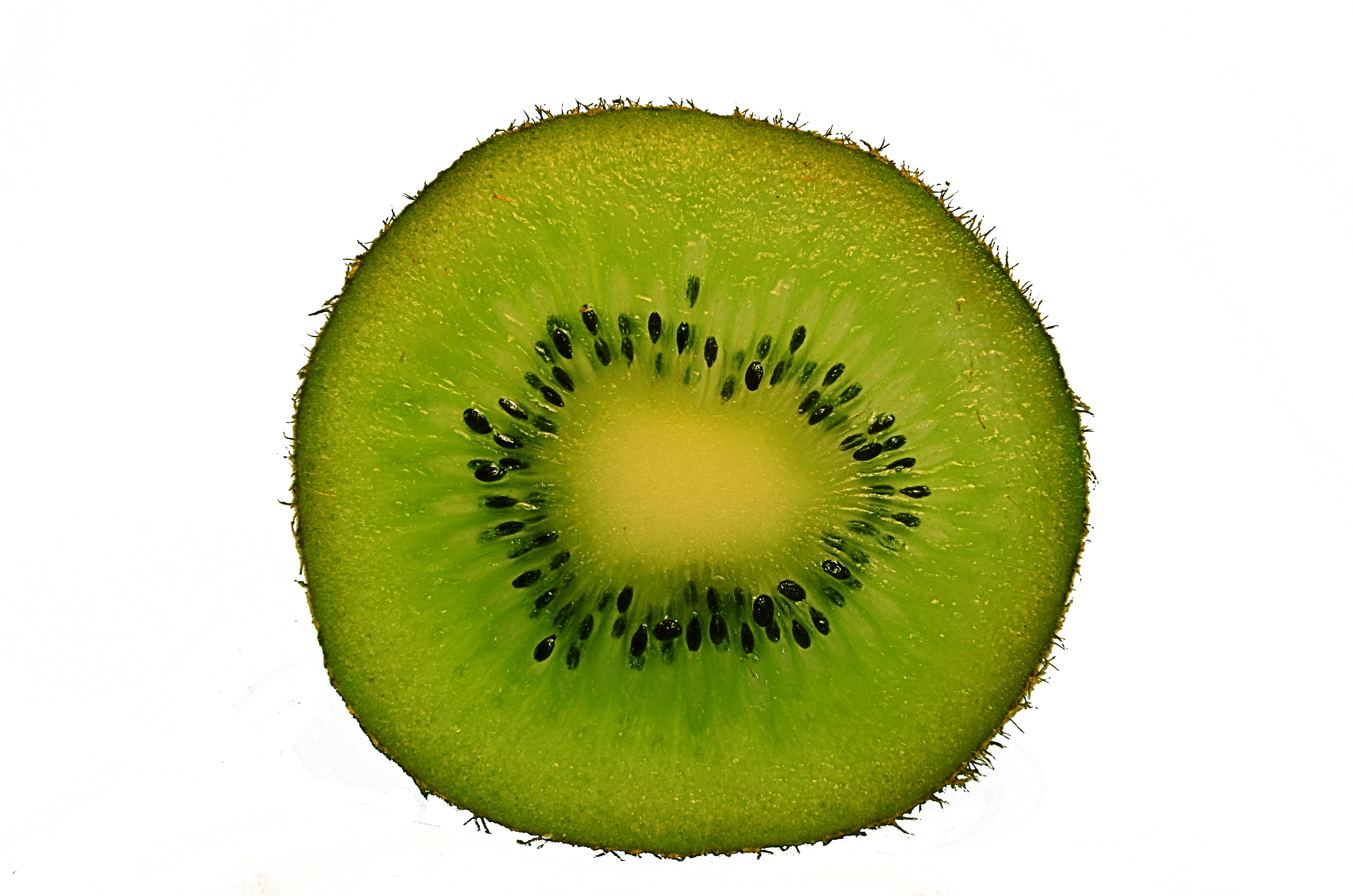
A sliced Chinese gooseberry

- Chinese steamed eggs
- Cantonese seafood soup — Canton province, now spelled Guangdong
- Sichuan pepper — Sichuan province

Fruits and vegetables

- Amur grape — the Amur River
- Chinese artichoke
- Chinese gooseberry (the original name of kiwifruit)
- Chinese mustard
- Chinese parsley — better known as coriander or cilantro
- Chinese pear and Chinese white pear
- Gobi manchurian — Indian fried cauliflower dish named after the Manchuria region
- Hainan yellow lantern chili — the island province of Hainan

Meat products and dishes

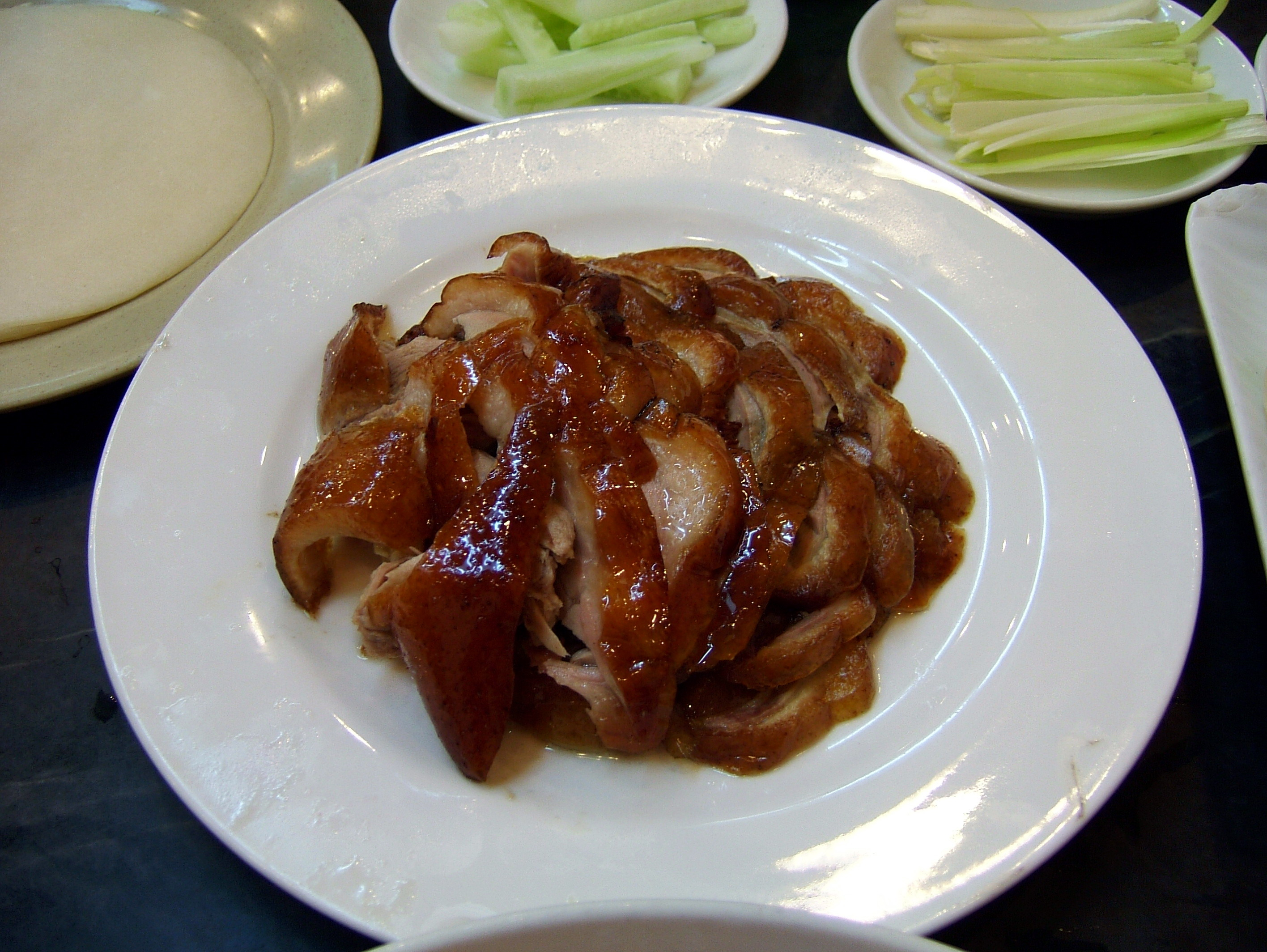
Dezhou braised chicken

- Anfu ham — Anfu County, Jiangxi
- Chinese chicken salad
- Dezhou braised chicken — the city of Dezhou, Shandong
- Dong'an chicken — Dong'an County, Hunan
- Fujian red wine chicken — Fujian province
- Hainanese chicken rice — Hainan province
- Jinhua ham — the city of Jinhua, Zhejiang
- Lanzhou beef lamian — the city of Lanzhou, Gansu
- Nanjing Salted Duck — the city of Nanjing, Jiangsu
- Peking duck — the city of Beijing
- Peking pork — mistakenly after the city of Beijing
- Wenchang chicken — the city of Wenchang, Hainan
- Wuhan duck — the city of Wuhan, Hubei
- Wuxi Fried Spare Ribs — the city of Wuxi, Jiangsu

Staple food

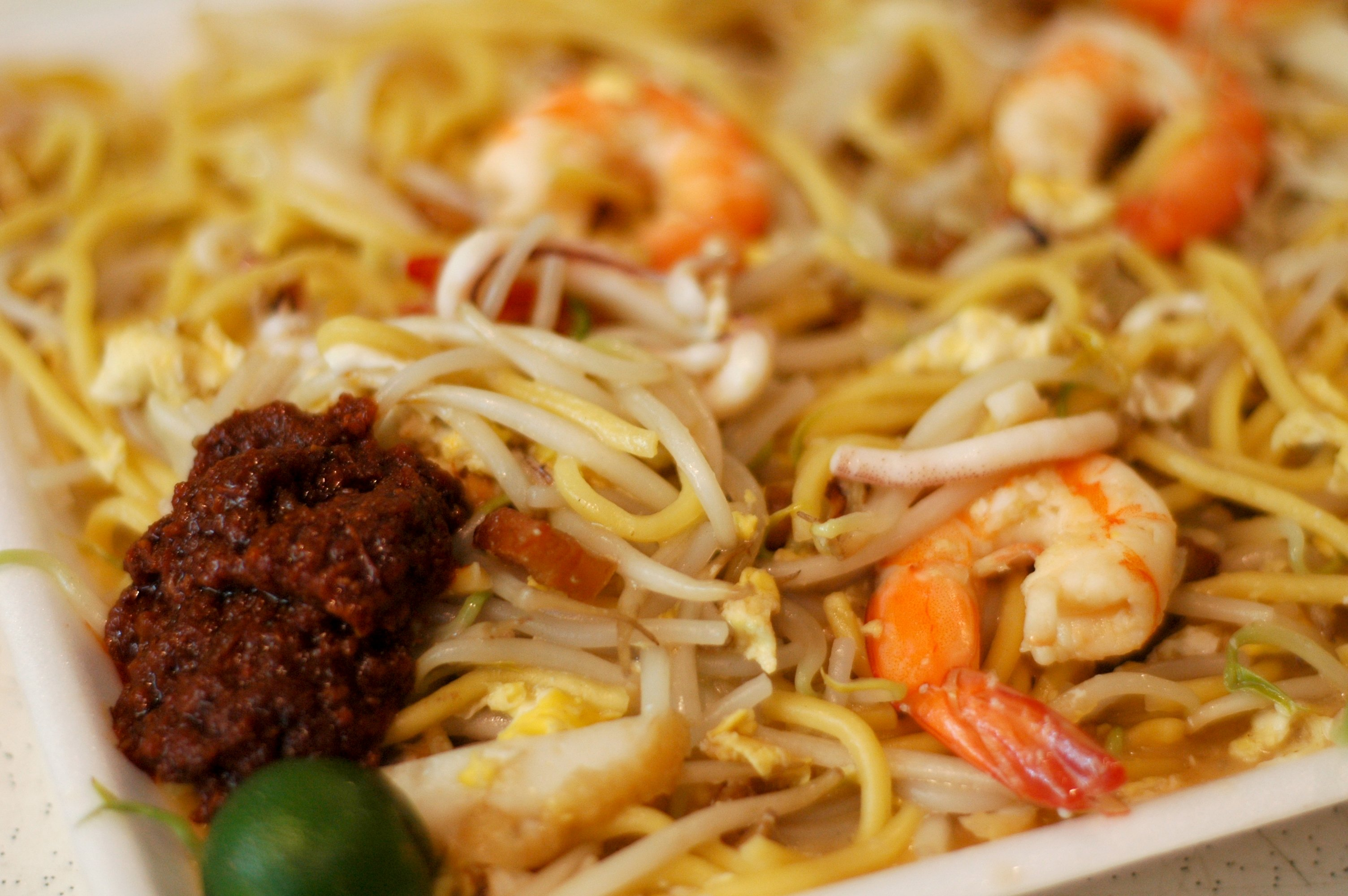
Hokkien Mee

- Chinese dumplings
- Chinese pancake
- Chinese sticky rice
- Chinkiang pot cover noodles — the city of Zhenjiang, Jiangsu
- Danyang barley porridge — the city of Danyang, Jiangsu
- Hainanese curry rice — Hainan province
- Hokkien fried rice and Hokkien mee — Fujian province, formerly romanized as Hokkien
- Shanghai fried noodles and Shanghai-style noodles — the city of Shanghai
- Yangzhou fried rice — the city of Yangzhou, Jiangsu

==== Japan ====
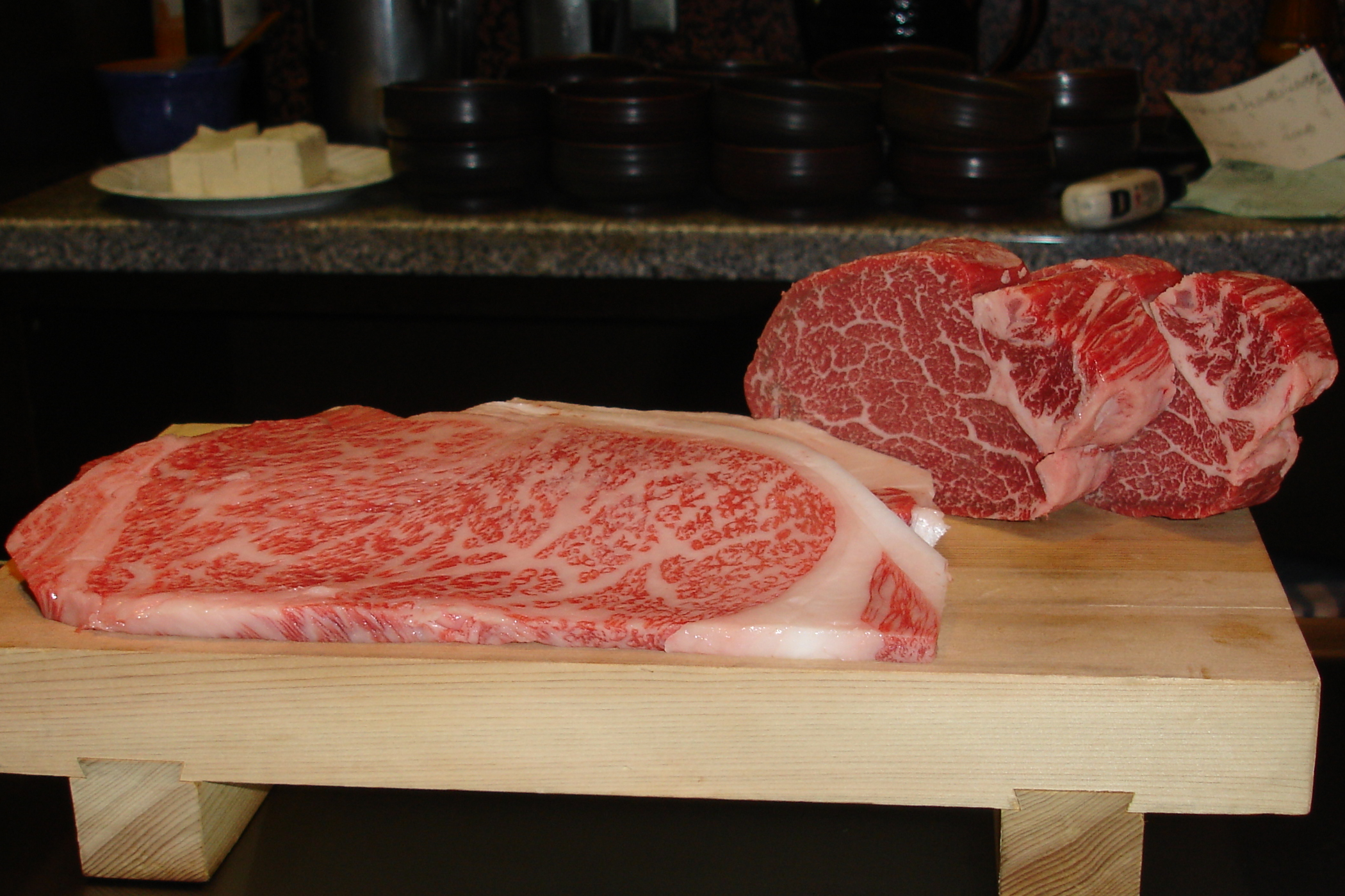
Kobe beef

- Chikuzenni — chicken dish named after the historical Chikuzen Province, Kyushu
- Japanese curry
- Japanese rice
- Kobe beef — the city of Kobe, Kansai region
- Matsusaka beef — the city of Matsusaka, Mie, Kansai region
- Okinawa soba — noodle soup from the Okinawa Islands
- Yonezawa beef — the city of Yonezawa, Yamagata, Tōhoku region

Fruits

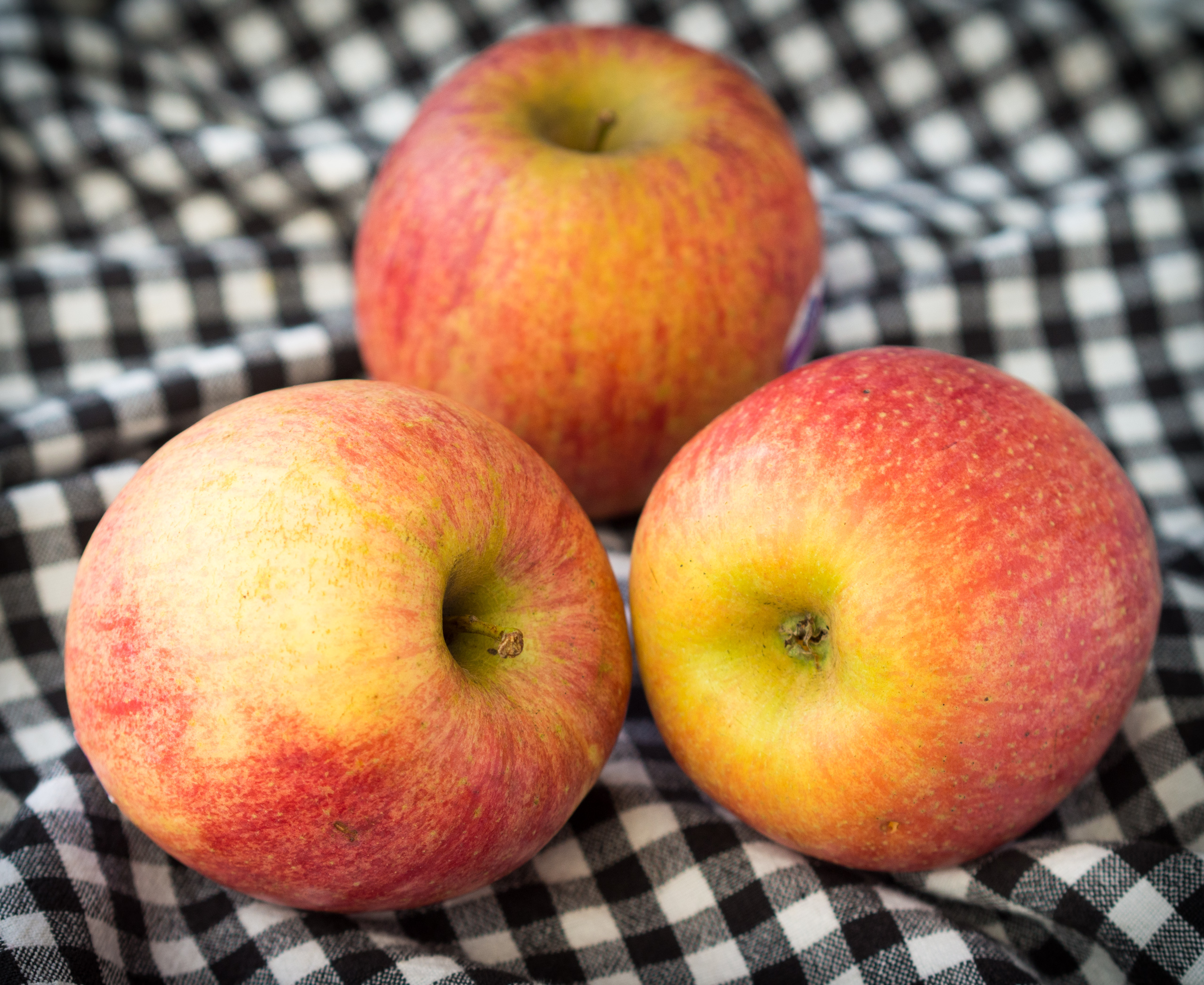
Fuji apples

- Fuji apple — the town of Fujisaki, Aomori, northern Honshu
- Hyuganatsu — citrus named after the historical province of Hyūga
- Iyokan — citrus named after the historical province of Iyo
- Kiyomi — citrus named after the Kiyomi-gata lagoon in Shizuoka City
- Koshu grape — the city of Kōshū, Yamanashi
- Mutsu apple — Mutsu Province, northern Honshu
- Satsuma mandarin — the historical province of Satsuma
- Yubari King — melon named after the city of Yūbari, Hokkaido

==== Korea ====
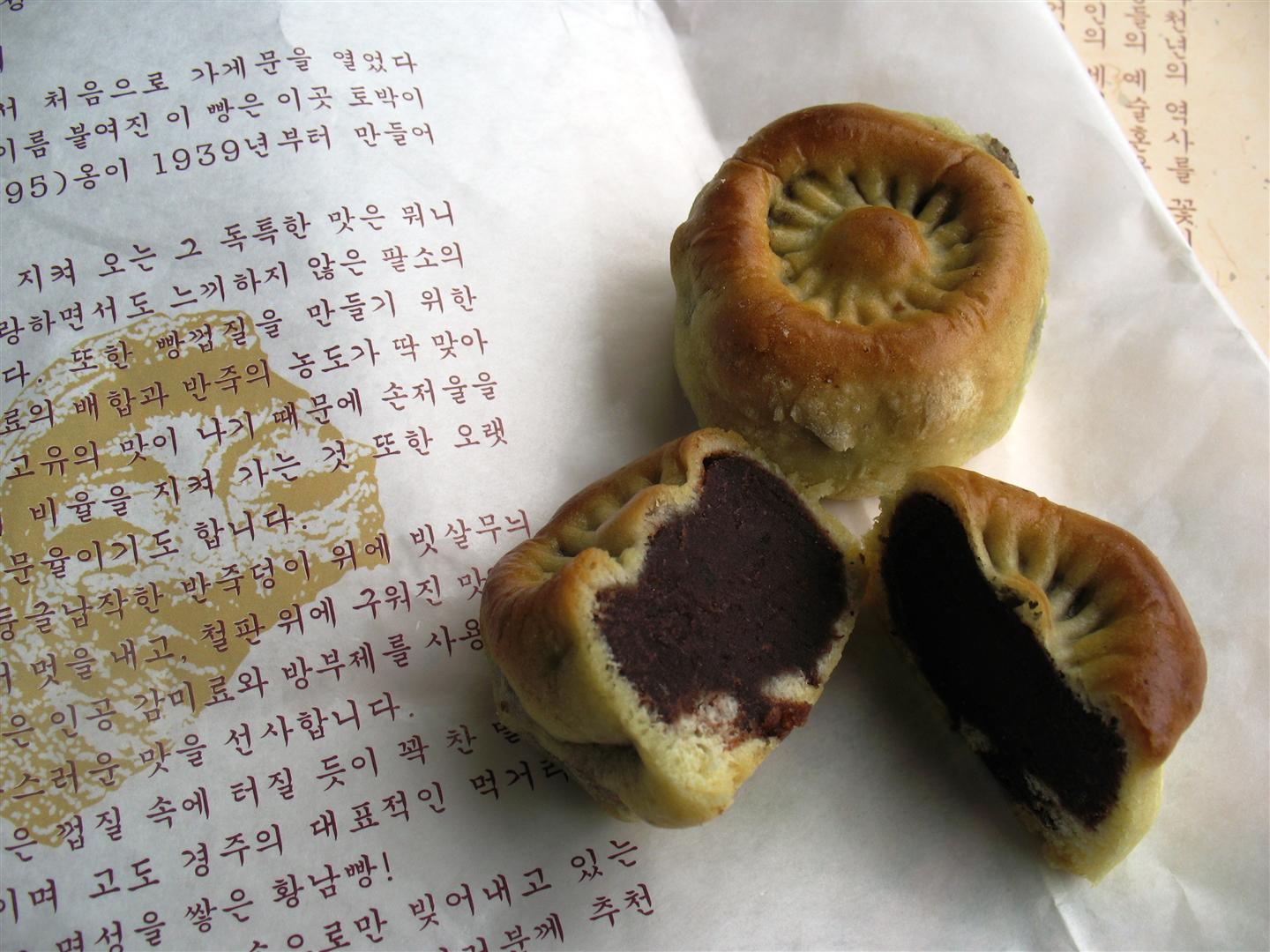
Gyeongju or Hwangnam bread

- Korean barbecue
- Korean black goat stew
- Korean fried chicken
- Korean melon
- Korean tacos — Korean-Mexican fusion dish originated in Los Angeles
- Andong jjimdak — chicken dish named after the city of Andong, South Korea
- Cheongyang chili pepper — Cheongyang County, South Korea
- Chuncheon dakgalbi — stir-fried chicken from the city of Chuncheon, South Korea
- Chuncheon makguksu — buckwheat noodles dish from Chuncheon
- Gyeongju bread — the city of Gyeongju, South Korea
- Hamhung naengmyeon — noodles dish from the city of Hamhung, North Korea
- Hansik ganjang — "Korean-style soy sauce"
- Hwangnam bread — from the province of Hwangnam-dong, South Korea
- Jeonju bibimbap — rice dish from the city of Jeonju, South Korea
- Pyongyang naengmyeon — noodle dish from the city of Pyongyang, North Korea

=== South Asia ===
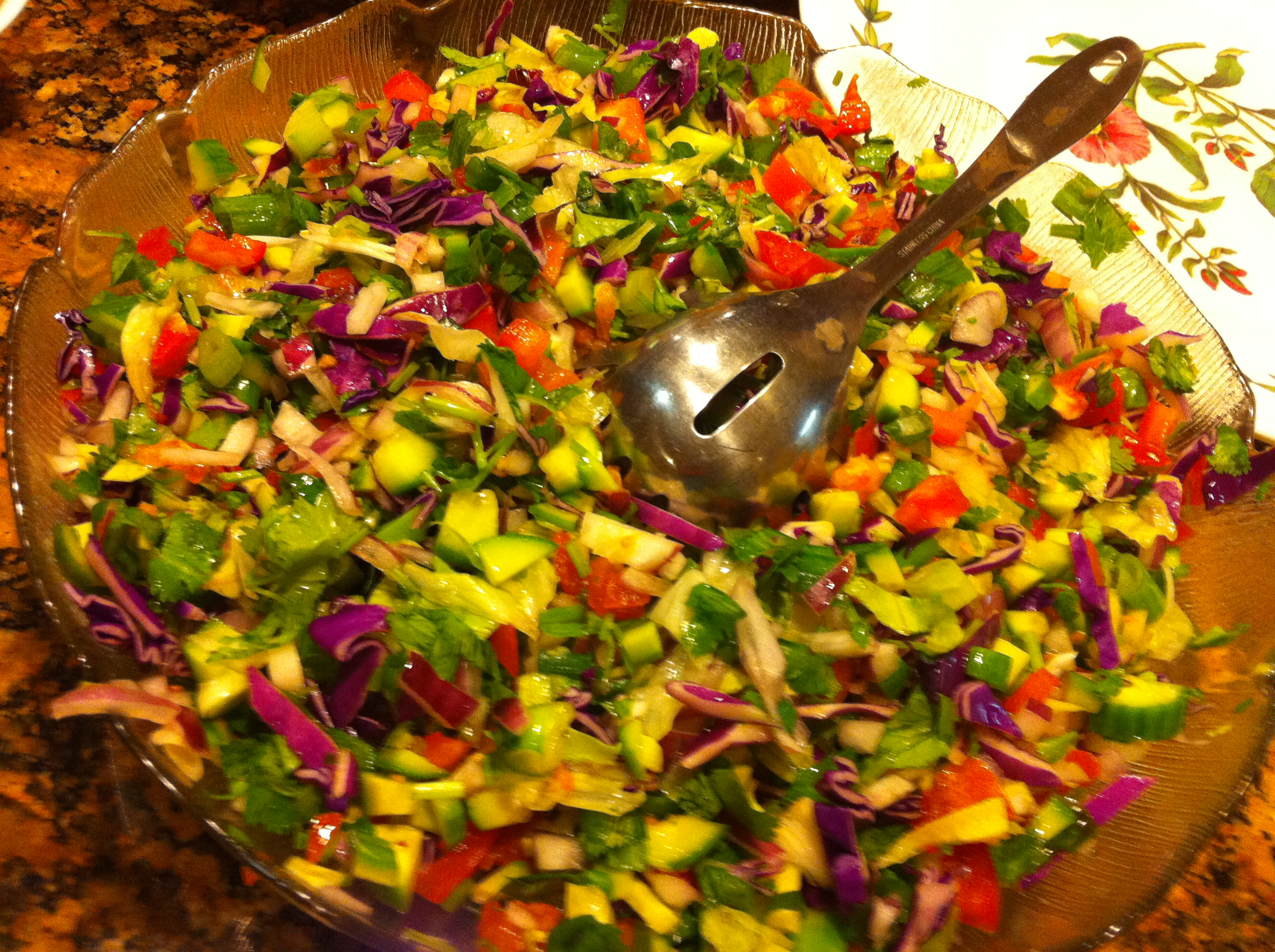
An Afghan salad

- Afghan biscuits — New Zealand cookie named after Afghanistan
- Afghan salad — Afghanistan
- Bhutanese red rice — Bhutan
- Ceylon (curry) — Sri Lanka
- Ceylon cinnamon — Sri Lanka
- Chicken Lahori — the city of Lahore, Punjab, Pakistan
- Nepal cardamom — Nepal
- Rangpur — citrus fruit named after Rangpur City, Bangladesh
- Sindhi biryani — mixed rice dish named after Sindh province, Pakistan
- Sindhi pulao — rice pilaf named after Sindh province

==== India ====
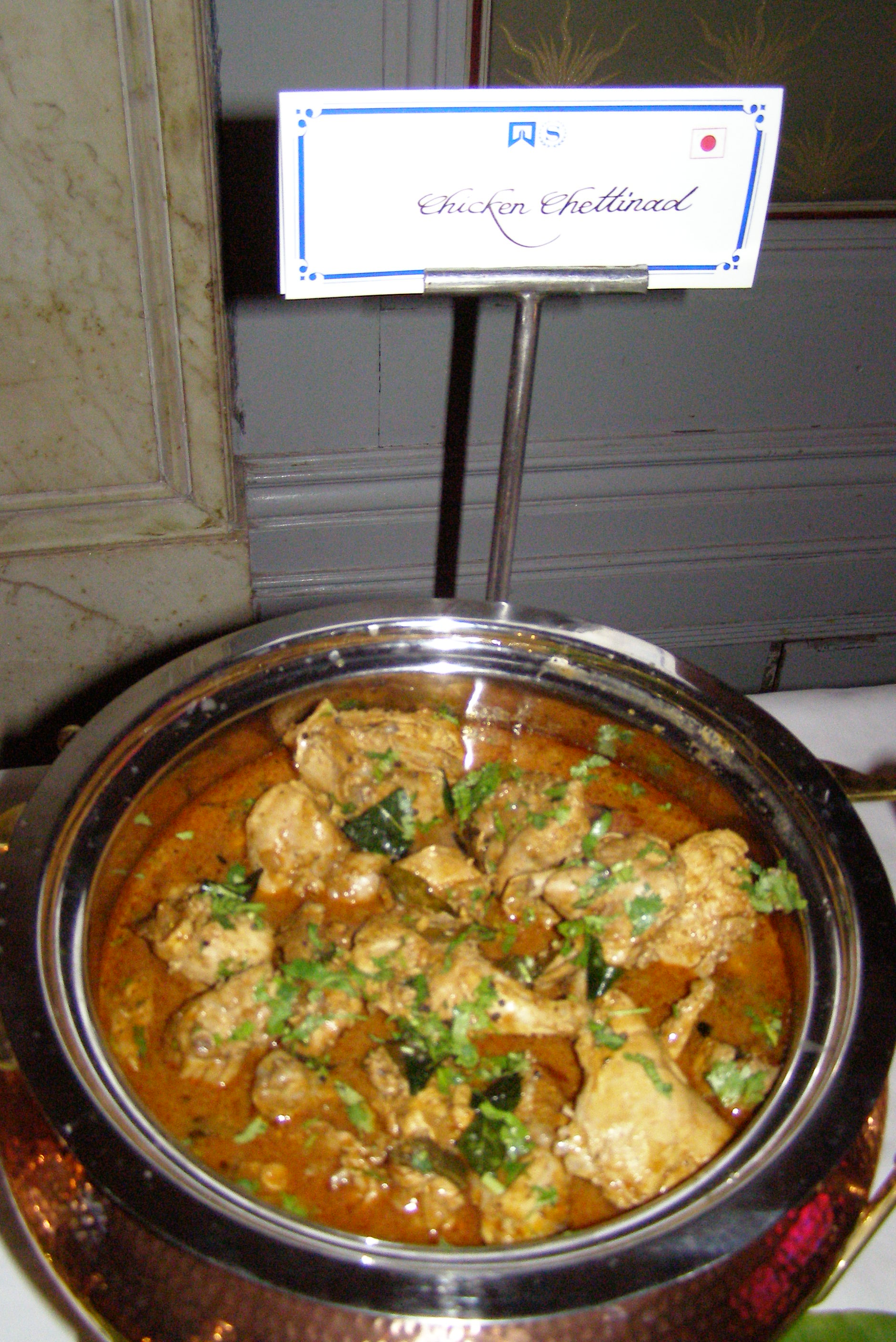
Chicken Chettinad

Amritsari Kulcha - the city Amritsar of Punjab

- Allahabadi cake — the city of Allahabad, Uttar Pradesh, north India
- Bandel cheese — the city of Bandel, West Bengal
- Bombay duck — fish dish named after the city of Bombay
- Chicken Chettinad — the region of Chettinad, Tamil Nadu
- Hyderabadi Biryani — the city Hyderabad and erstwhile Hyderabad State
- Hyderabadi Haleem — the city Hyderabad and erstwhile Hyderabad State
- Hyderabadi Marag — the city Hyderabad and erstwhile Hyderabad State
- Indian omelette
- Kakinada Kaja - the city Kakinada, Andhra Pradesh
- Kalimpong cheese — the hill station of Kalimpong, West Bengal
- Madras curry sauce — the city of Madras (now Chennai), Tamil Nadu
- Malabar matthi curry — the Malabar Coast, southeast India
- Mangalore Buns - banana and yogurt fried bread from Mangalore
- Mangalorean Bangude Masala — fish dish named after the city of Mangalore, Karnataka
- Mangalorean Chicken Sukka — the city of Mangalore, Karnataka
- Mysore pak — the city of Mysore, Karnataka
- Narsobawadi Basundi — dessert from the town of Narsobawadi, Maharashtra
- Tirunelveli Halva — the city of Tirunelveli, Tamil Nadu
- Thoothukudi or Tuticorin macaroon — the city of Thoothukudi (formerly Tuticorin), Tamil Nadu

Fruits and vegetables

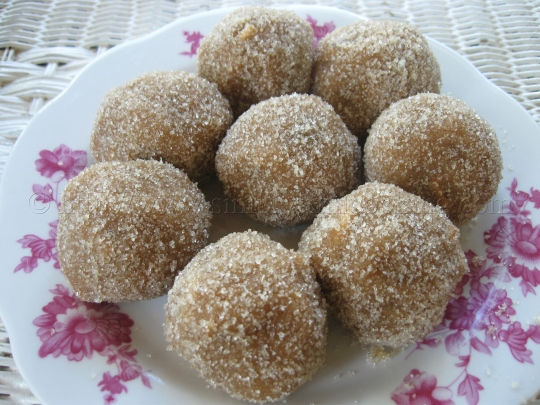
Tamarind balls from Trinidad and Tobago

- Bangalore Blue — grape grown in districts around Bangalore city, Karnataka
- Bikaneri bhujia — bean-based snack food from the town of Bikaner, Rajasthan
- Devanahalli pomelo — the town of Devanahalli, Karnataka
- Mahabaleshwar strawberry — the city of Mahabaleshwar, Maharashtra
- Malabar spinach — the Malabar Coast
- Naga Morich, Dorset Naga and Naga Viper peppers — Nagaland state
- Nagpur orange — the city of Nagpur, Maharashtra
- Nashik grape — Nashik district, Maharashtra
- Tamarind — "date of India" in Arabic
- Tasgaon grapes — the city of Tasgaon, Maharashtra
- Udupi Mattu Gulla — eggplant from the village of Matti, Udupi, Karnataka

Staple food

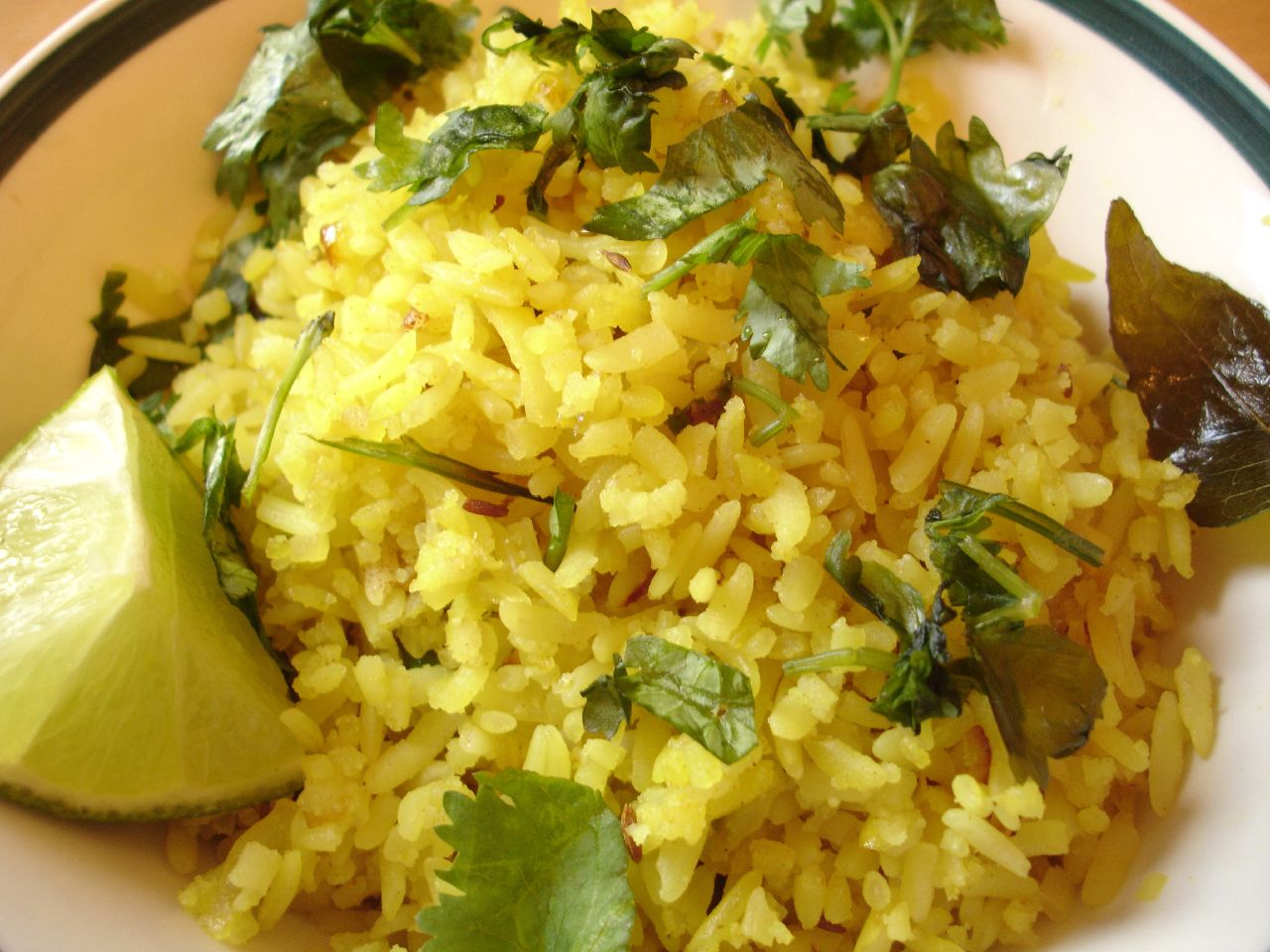
Indori Poha

- Bhalia wheat — the Bhal region of Gujarat
- Bombay potatoes and Bombay toast — the city of Mumbai
- Hyderabadi biryani — rice dish from the city of Hyderabad, Telangana
- Indori Poha — rice dish from the city of Indore, Madhya Pradesh
- Kerala porotta — flatbread from Kerala state
- Palakkadan Matta rice — the district of Palakkad, Kerala
- Patna rice — the city of Patna, Bihar
- Thalassery biryani — rice dish from the town of Thalassery, Kerala

=== Southeast Asia ===
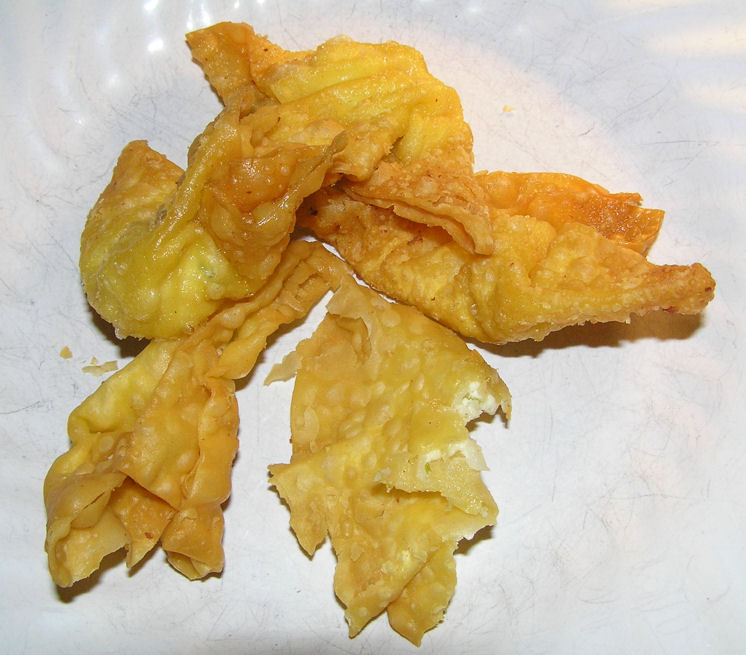
Crab Rangoon

- Burmese tofu — Burma
- Crab Rangoon — the city of Rangoon, formally Yangon, Burma
- Katong Laksa — noodle soup named after the Katong precinct, Singapore
- Lao sausage — Laos
- Maldives fish — the island country of Maldives
- Singapore chow mein — Cantonese fried noodle dish named after the city-state of Singapore
- Singapore-style noodles — Singapore

==== Indonesia ====
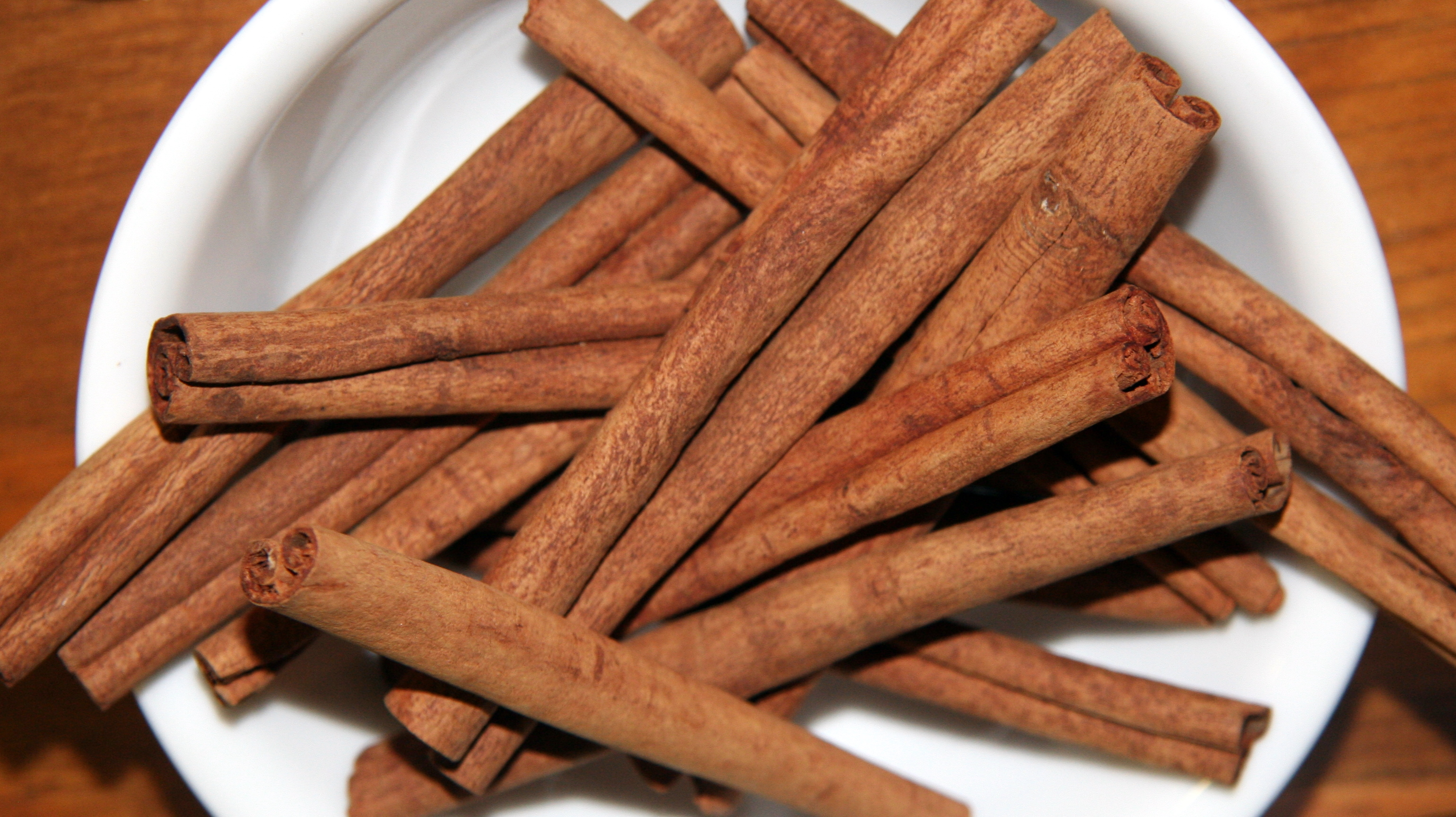
Indonesian cinnamon

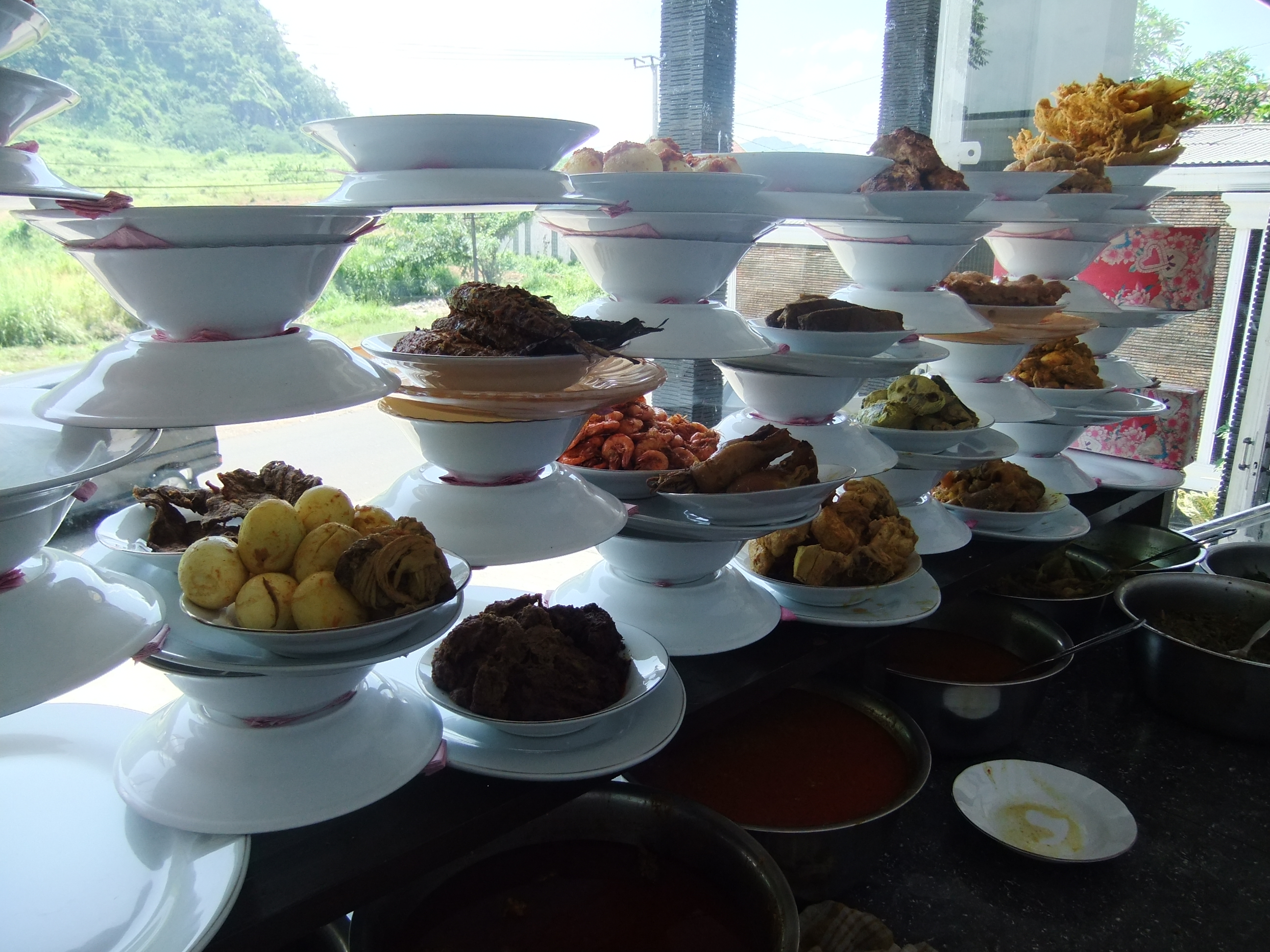
Nasi Padang

- Ayam taliwang — chicken dish named after the town of Karang Taliwang, near Mataram, Lombok
- Bakpia Pathok — sweet rolls from the Pathok suburb of Yogyakarta, Java
- Batavia cassia (or Indonesian cinnamon) — the city of Batavia, Dutch East Indies, now Jakarta
- Bika Ambon — cake first sold at Ambon Street, Medan, north Sumatra. The street may have been named after Ambon Island, Moluccas
- Garut orange — Garut Regency, West Java
- Mie aceh — noodle dish from the region of Aceh, Sumatra
- Nasi Kapau — rice dish from the town of Nagari Kapau, near Bukittinggi, West Sumatra
- Nasi Padang — rice banquet from the city of Padang, West Sumatra
- Padang cassia (Indonesian cinnamon) — the city of Padang, West Sumatra
- Padang crab — the city of Padang, West Sumatra
- Sambal cibiuk — hot sauce from Cibiuk district, Garut Regency, West Java
- Sate Bandeng — Banten province, Java
- Sate Padang — the city of Padang, West Sumatra

==== Malaysia ====
- Malay rose apple or pommerac (<"pomme Malac")
- Mee bandung Muar — the town of Muar, Johor
- Sarawak layer cake or 'Kek Lapis Sarawak — the state of Sarawak, northern Borneo
- Sarawak Noodles
- Penang Laksa
- Malacca Chicken Rice Balls
- Ipoh Taugeh Chicken Rice
- Johor Mee Rubus

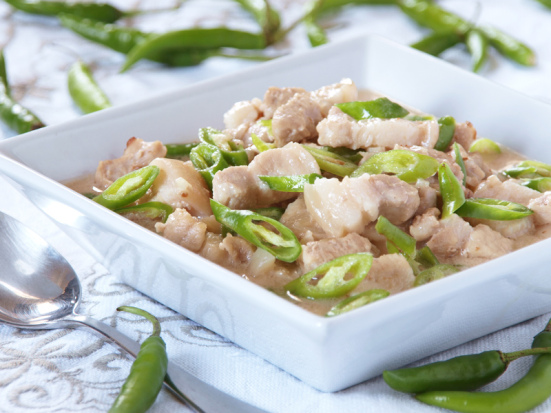
Bicol Express

==== Philippines ====
- Bicol express — the Bicol Region, Philippines
- Pancit Malabon — the city of Malabon, Metro Manila
- Pastel de Camiguín — the island province of Camiguin
- Sagada orange — the town of Sagada, Luzon

==== Thailand ====
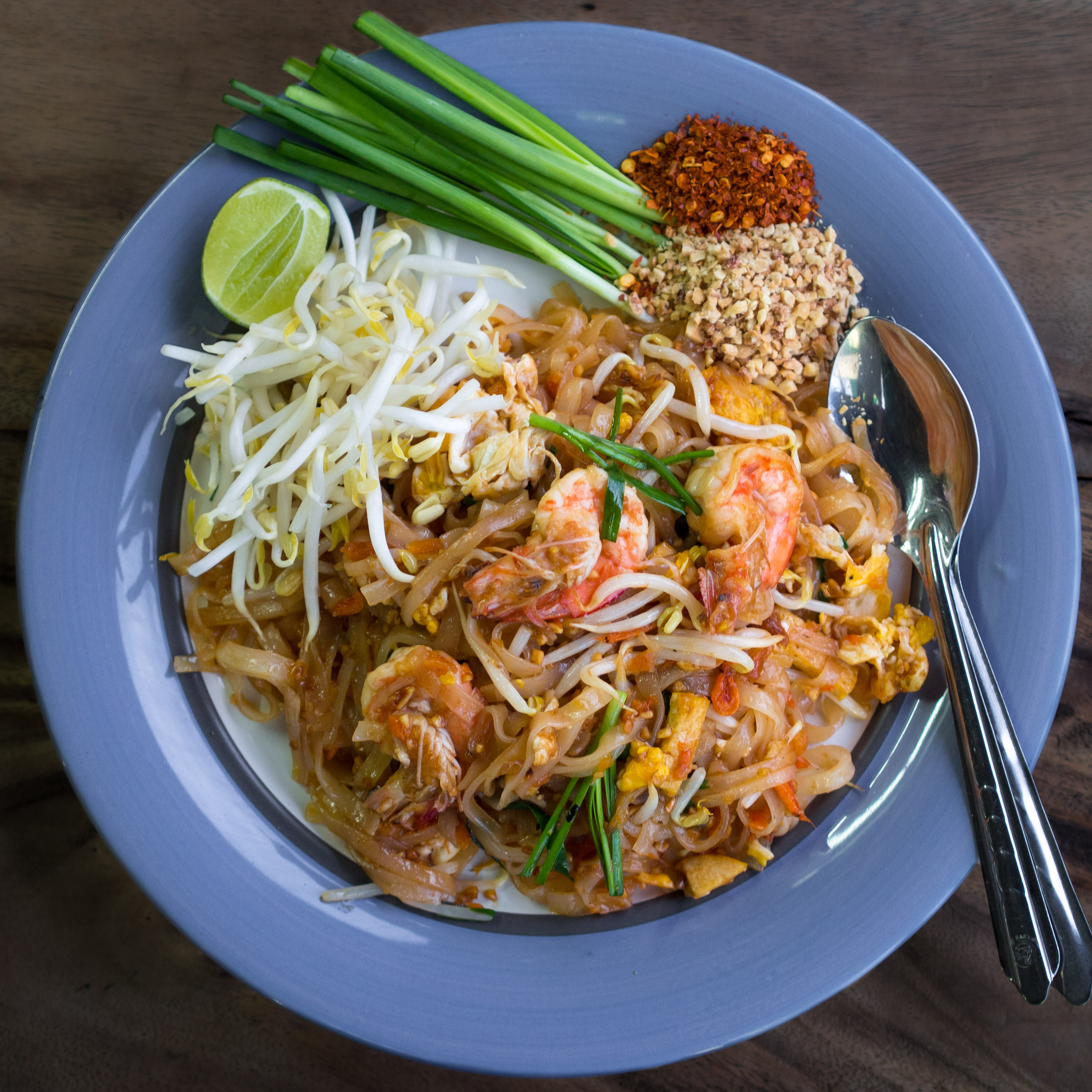
Pad Thai

- Mee siam — Malaysian noodle dish named after Siam (Thailand)
- Nasi goreng pattaya — Malaysian dish named after the Thai city of Pattaya, Chonburi
- Pad Thai — "fried Thai style"
- Sriracha sauce — the city of Si Racha, Chonburi Province
- Thai basil
- Thai crepes
- Thai eggplant
- Thai fried rice
- Thai ginger

==== Vietnam ====
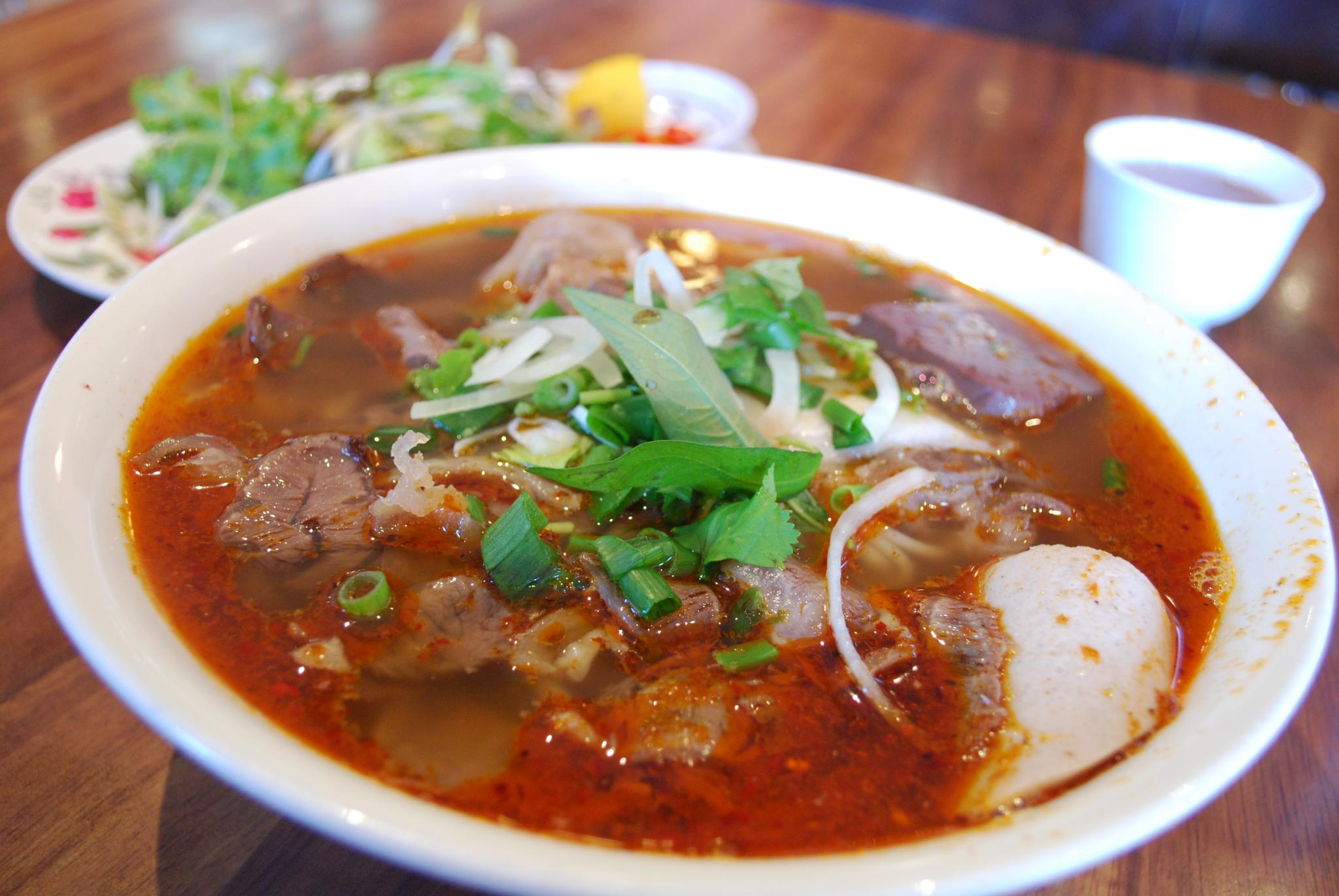
Bún bò Huế

- Bánh cuốn Thanh Trì — rice noodle roll from the Thanh Trì District of Hanoi
- Bún bò Huế — soup from the city of Huế
- Champa rice — the historical region of Champa
- Mì Quảng — Quảng Nam
- Saigon cinnamon — the city of Saigon, now Ho Chi Minh City
- Trảng Bàng dew-wetted rice paper — the Trảng Bàng District
- Vietnamese coriander
- Vietnamese eggplant

=== West Asia ===
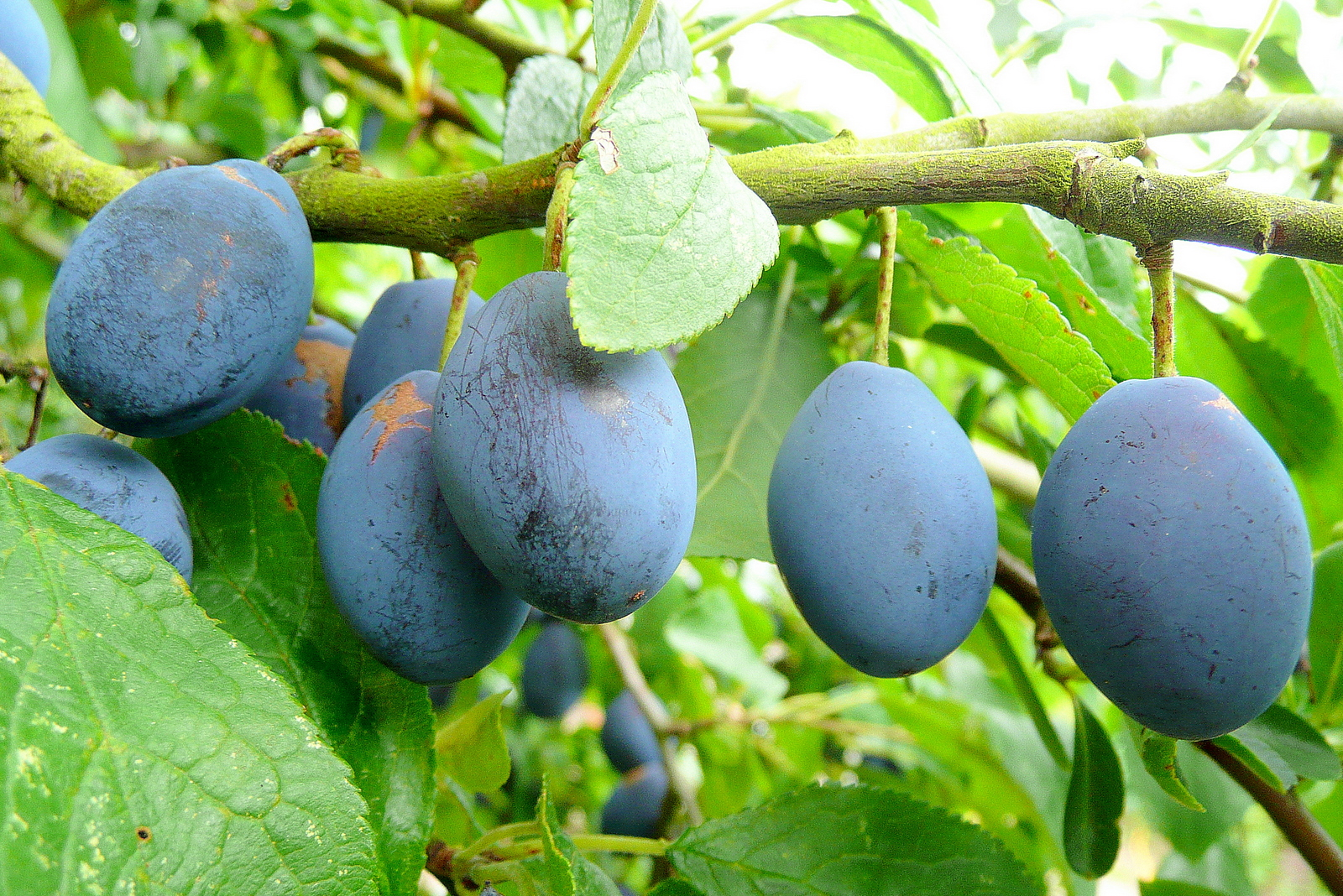
Damsons

- Azerbaijani pakhlava — a pastry from Azerbaijan
- Aleppo pepper — the city of Aleppo, Syria
- Nabulsi cheese — the city of Nablus, Palestine
- Damson or damson plum — the city of Damascus, Syria
- Phoenicia dessert — the ancient region of Phoenicia headquartered in present day Lebanon

==== Armenia ====
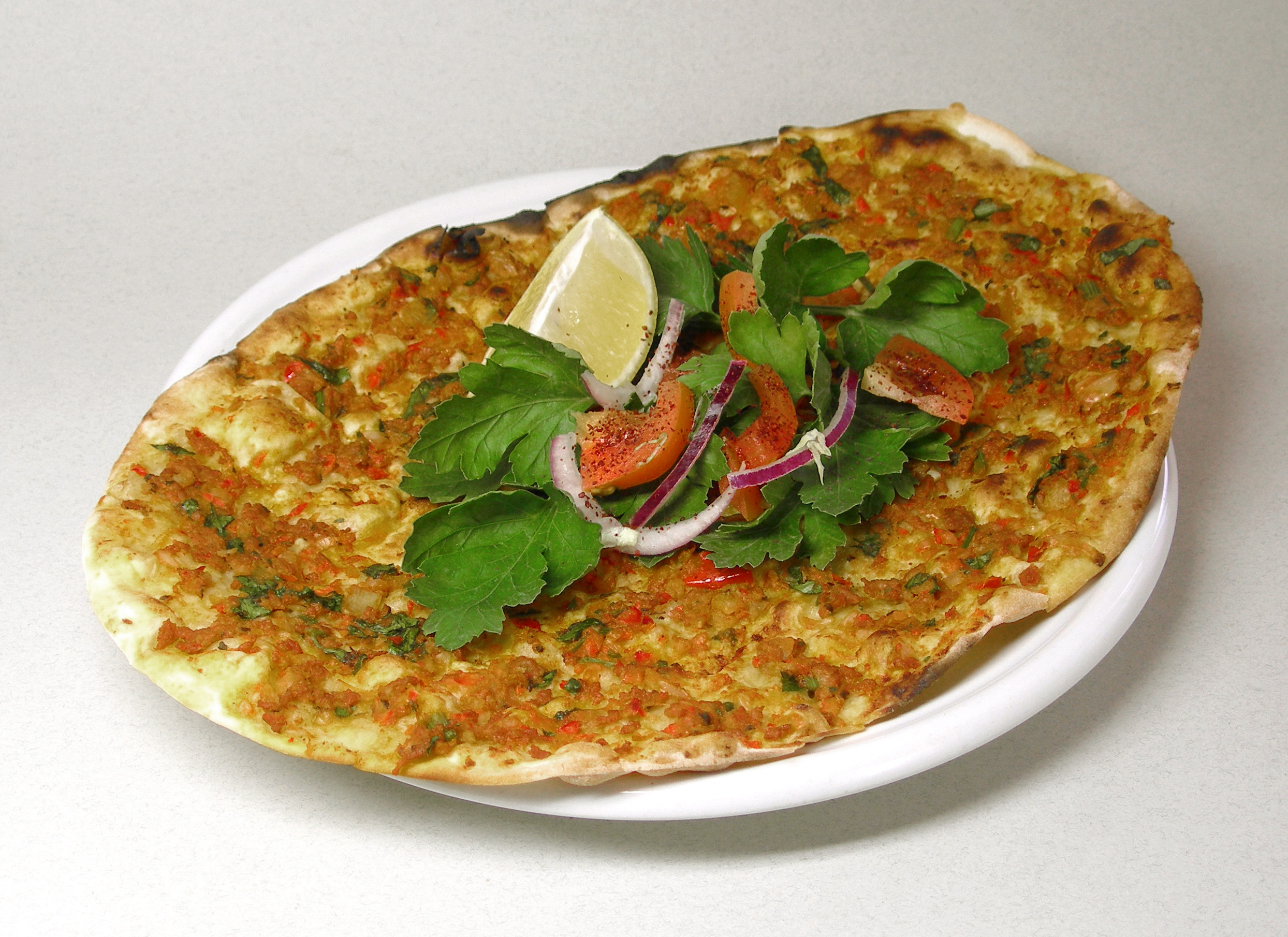
Armenian pizza or Lahmacun

- Armenian apple— the most common apricot, named "Prunus armeniaca"
- Armenian cracker bread or "Armenian lavash"
- Armenian cucumber
- Armenian pizza
- Armenian plum — "Prunus armeniaca"
- Armenian string cheese

==== Iran ====
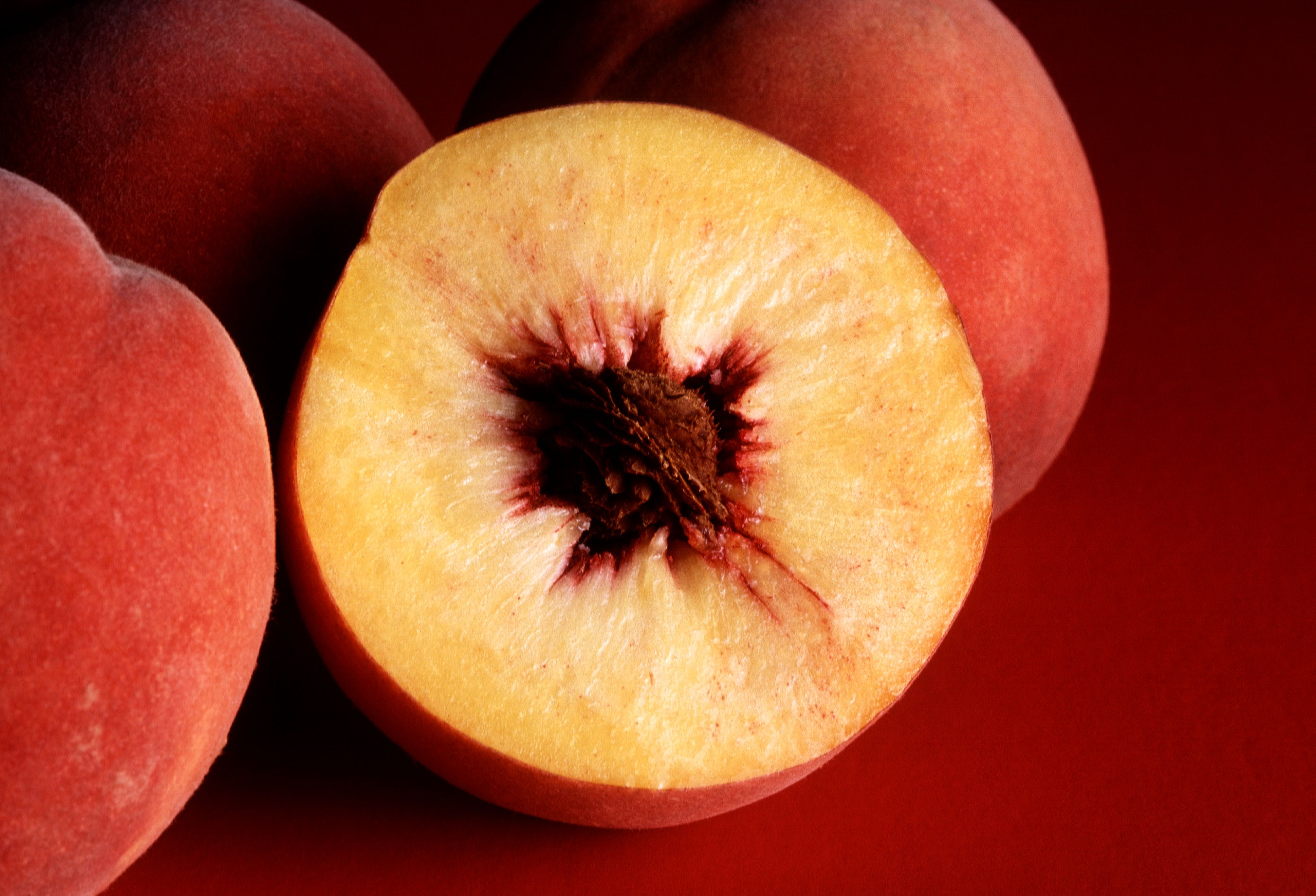
Peaches

- Iranian pizza
- Khorasan wheat — the historical region of Khorasan
- Lighvan cheese — the village of Liqvan
- Peach — via Latin Persica — Persia
- Persian and Persian bun — Canadian and American sweet breads named after Iran
- Persian cumin
- Persian lime
- Persian melon
- Təbriz meatballs — the city of Tabriz, Iranian Azerbaijan

==== Palestine ====
- Jaffa orange — the city of Jaffa now in Israel (Jaffa Cakes and Jaffas are named after the Jaffa orange)
- Palestinian sweet lime — the historical Palestine region

==== Turkey ====
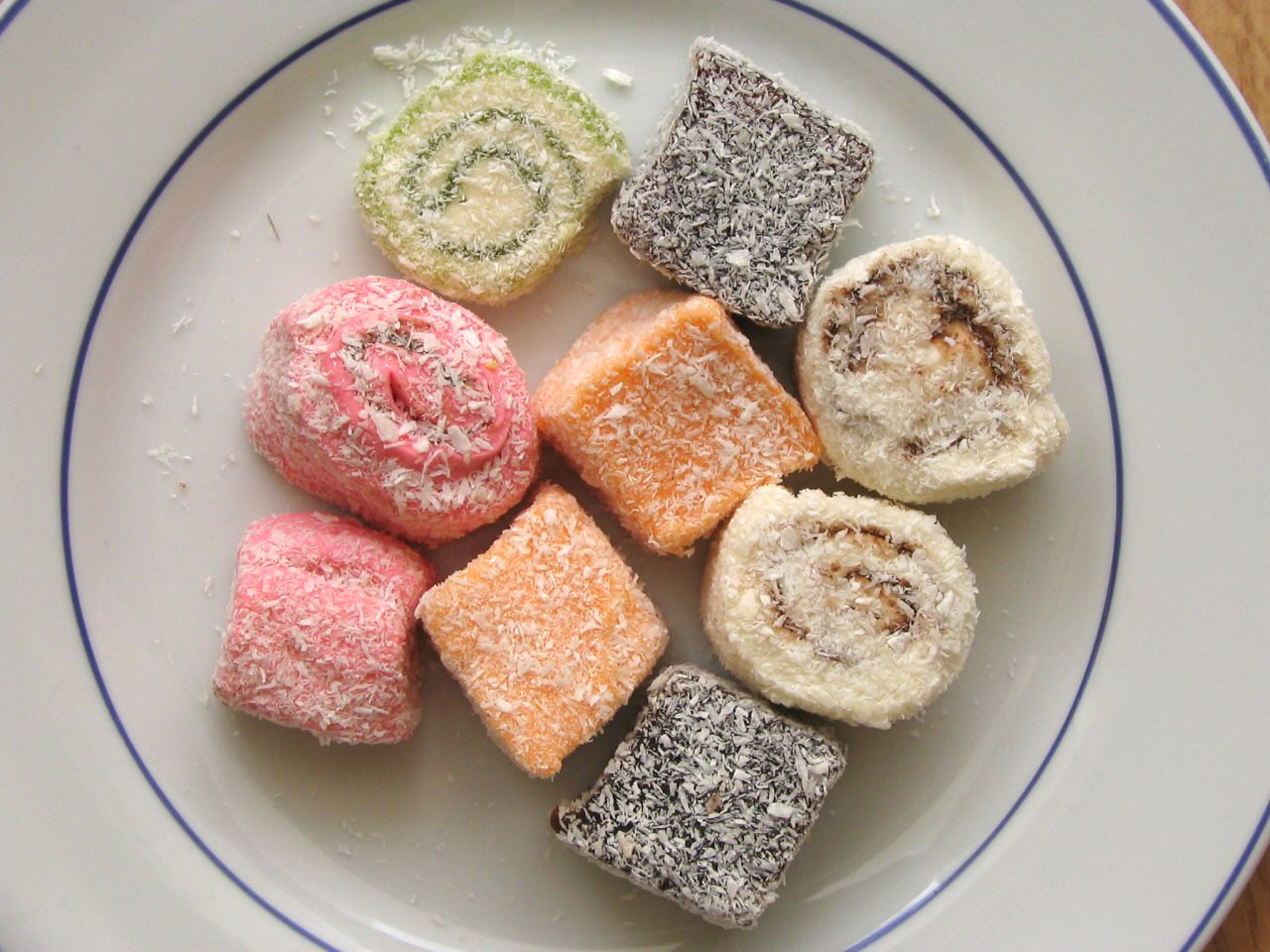
Turkish Delight

- Turkey fowl (despite not being from Turkey—see Turkey (bird)#Names)
- Gemlik olive — the town of Gemlik, Bursa Province
- Harput meatballs — the historic city of Harput, now Elazığ, Eastern Anatolia
- İnegöl meatballs — the city of İnegöl, Marmara region
- Smyrna meatballs — the ancient city of Smyrna, Aegean Region
- Tire meatballs — the district of Tire, İzmir, Aegean Region
- Turkish delight
- Van köfte — meatballs from the city of Van, Eastern Anatolia
- Menemen, Menemen, İzmir - A breakfast dish from Aegean Region containing peppers, tomato scrambled eggs and a controversial topic - onions.

== Europe ==
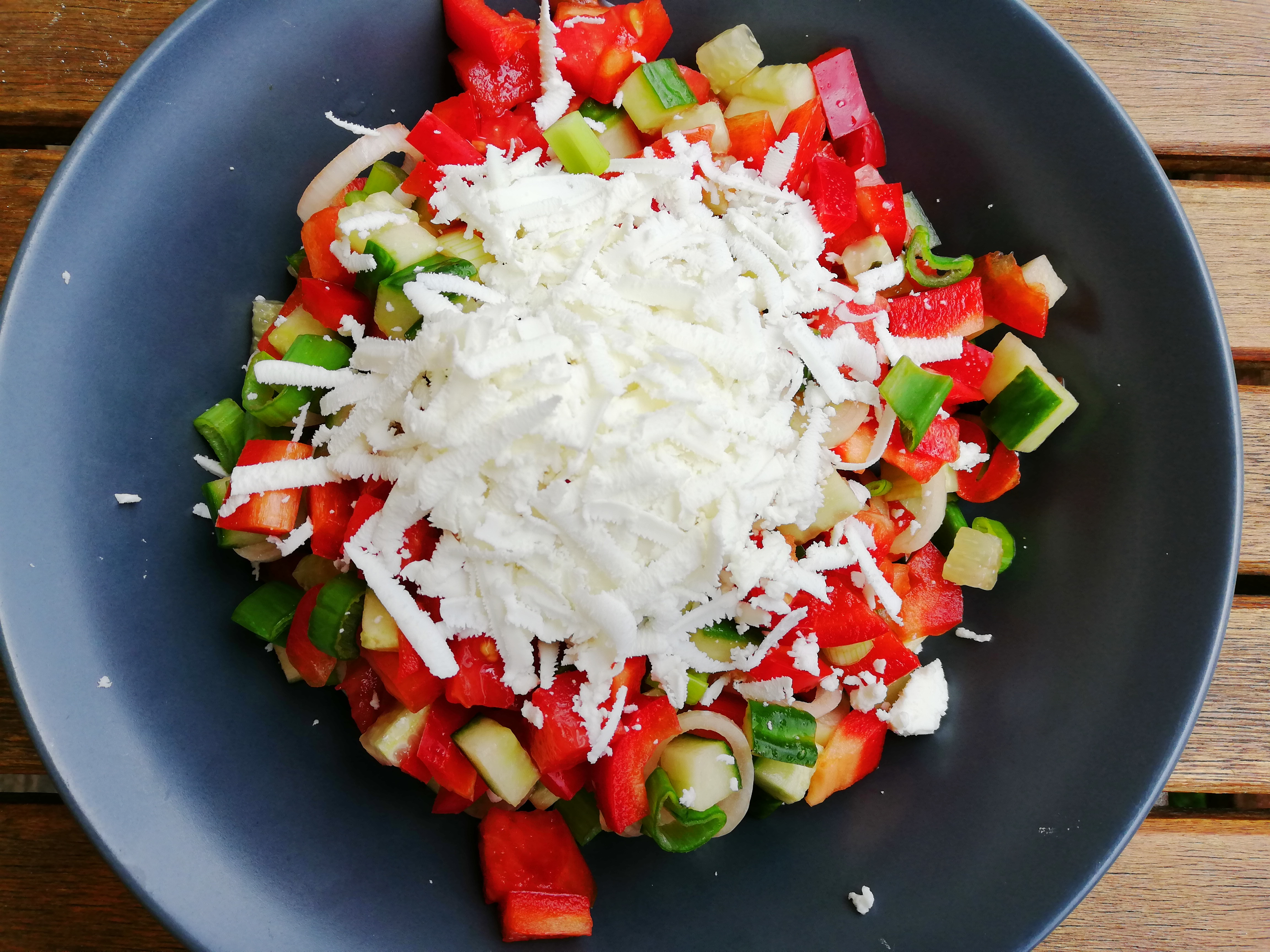
Shopska salad

=== Balkan States ===
- Albanian vegetable pie — Albania
- Bosnian Pot — Bosnia
- Bulgarian yogurt — Bulgaria
- Cherni Vit (cheese) — the village of Cherni Vit, Bulgaria
- Elenski but — ham from the town of Elena, Veliko Tarnovo, Bulgaria
- Macedonia — mixed salad alluding to the diverse origin of the people of Alexander's Macedonian Empire
- Shopska salad — the Shopluk region in Bulgaria, Serbia, and Macedonia
- Sremska sausage — the district of Srem, Vojvodina, Serbia

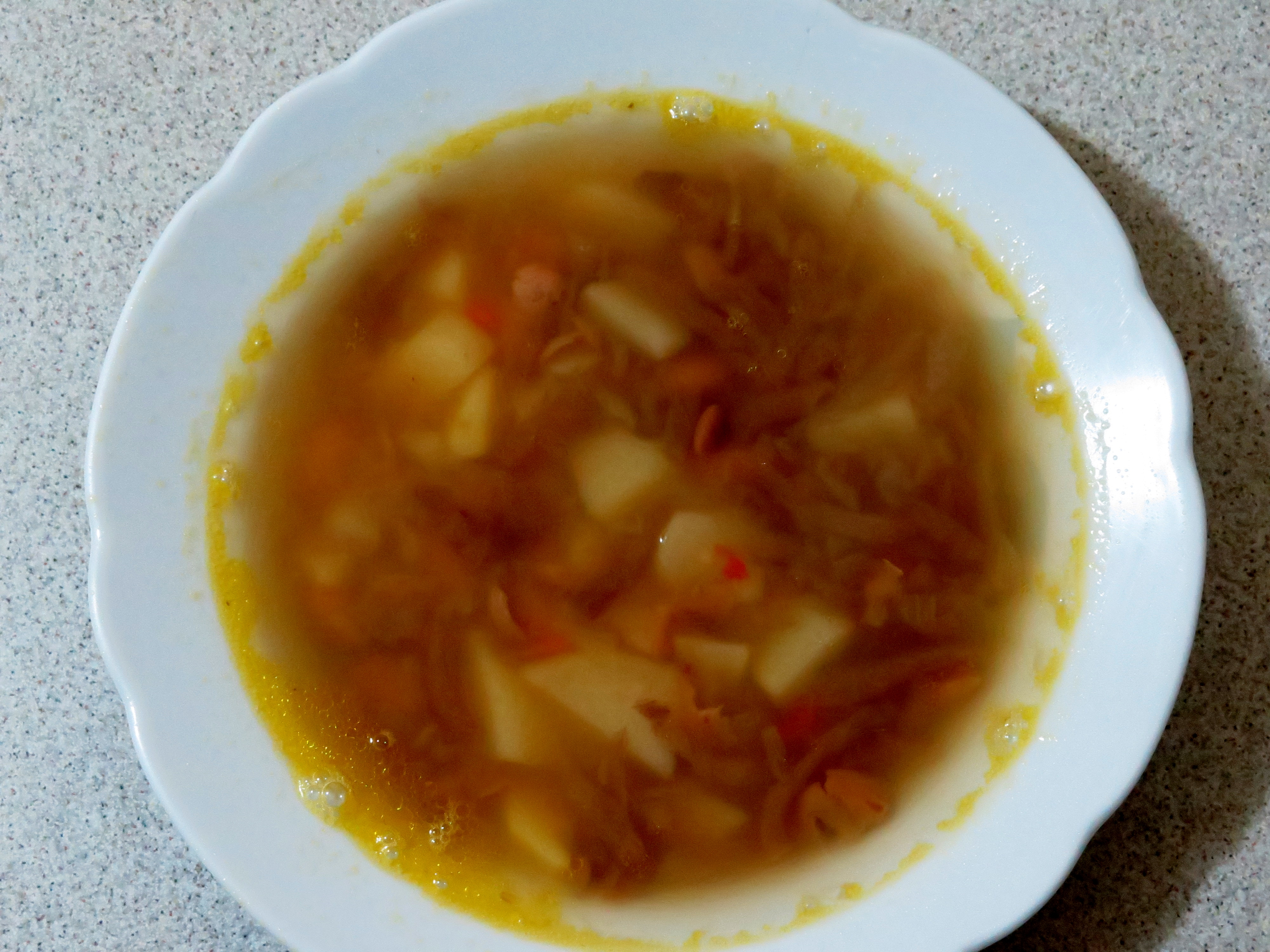
Istrian stew

==== Croatia ====
- Istrian stew — the Istria peninsula
- Međimurska gibanica — cake from Međimurje County
- Morlacco — Italian cheese named after the historical Morlachia region now located in Croatia
- Pag cheese — the island of Pag
- Rab cake — the island of Rab

==== Romania ====
- Magiun of Topoloveni — a plum named after the town of Topoloveni, Argeș County
- Nădlac sausage — the town of Nădlac, Arad County
- Penteleu cheese — the Penteleu Massive, Buzău County
- Pleșcoi sausages — the village of Pleşcoi, Buzău County
- Sibiu sausages — the city of Sibiu, Transylvania

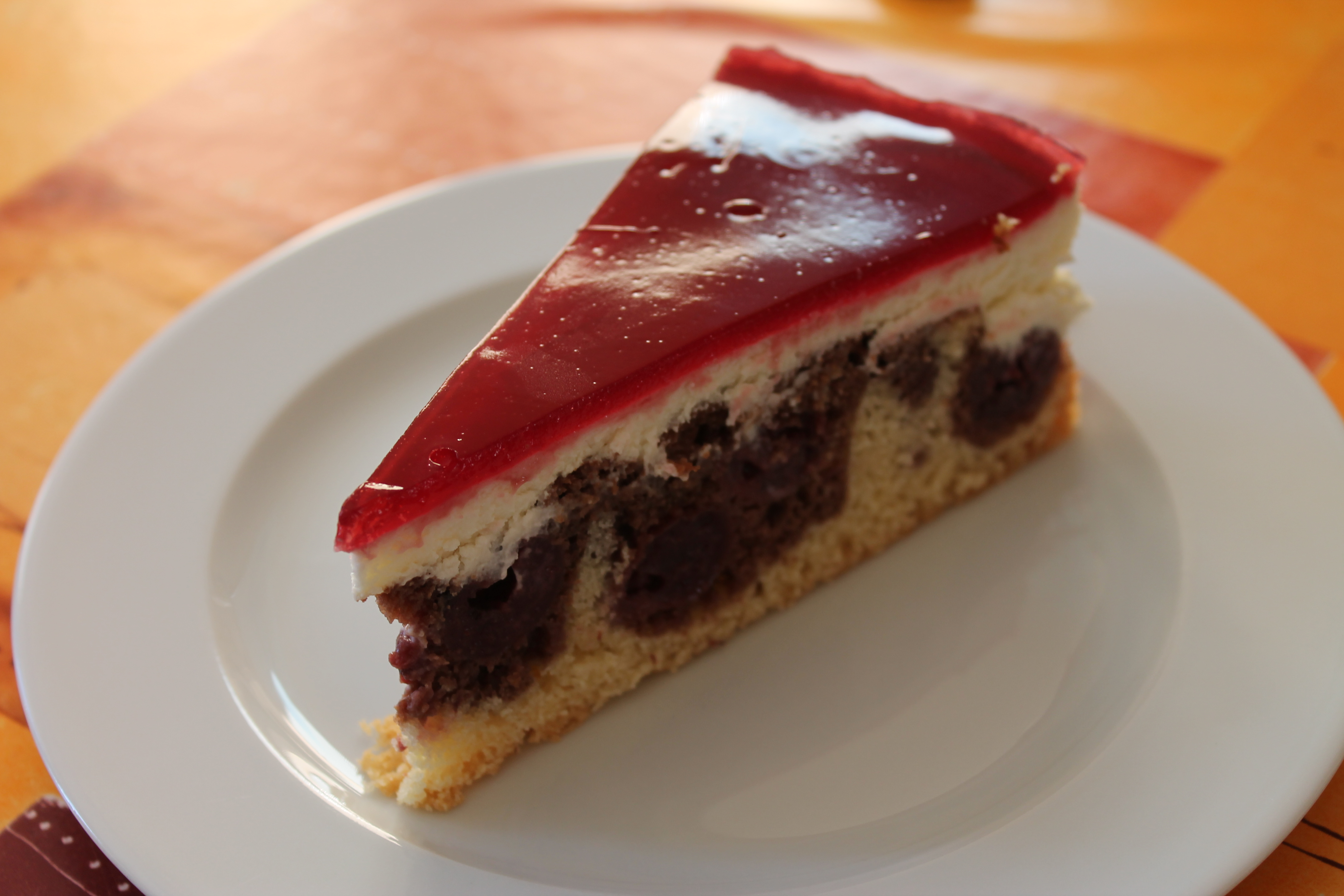
Donauwelle

=== Central Europe ===
==== Austria ====
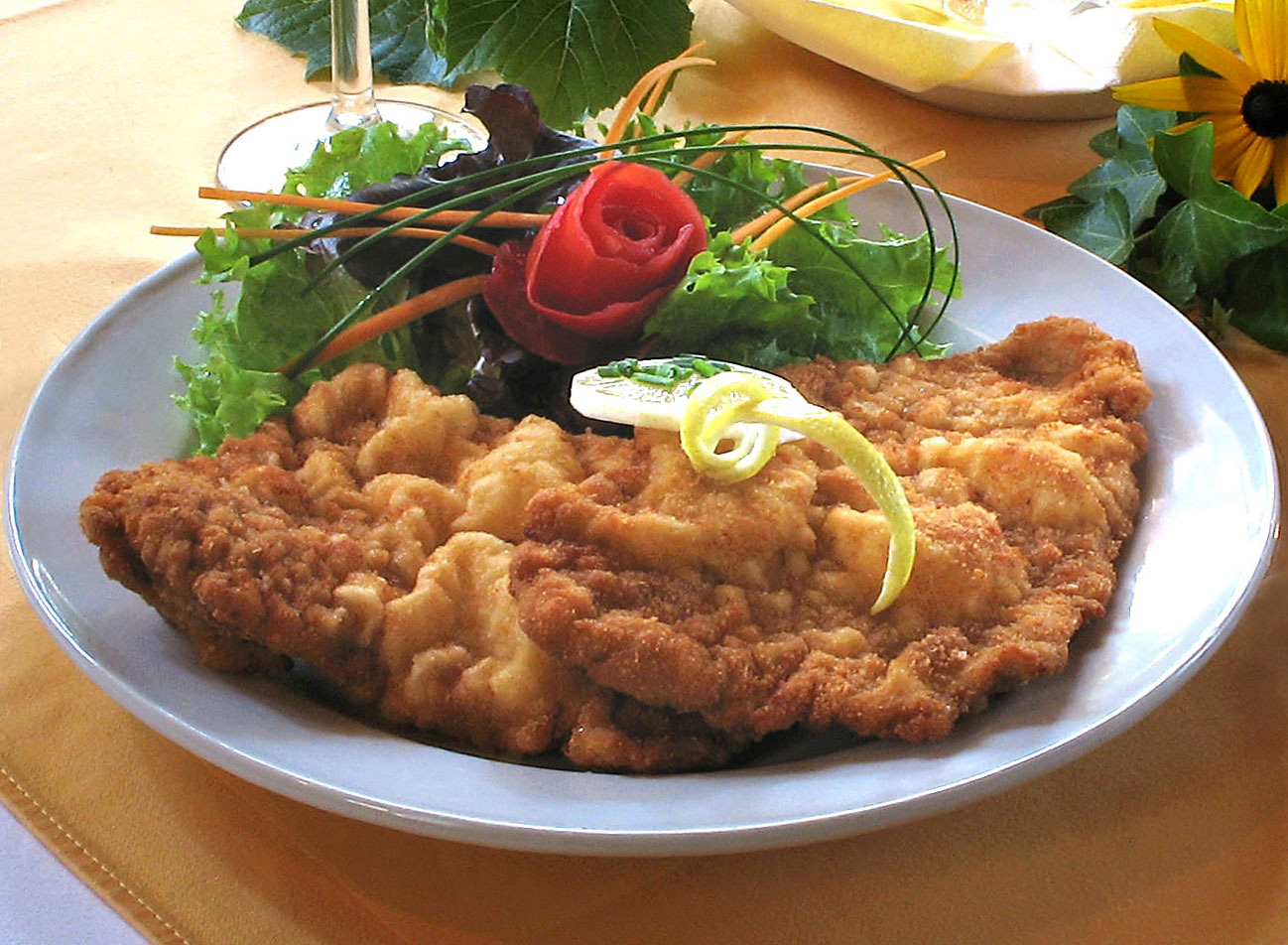
Wiener Schnitzel

- Donauwelle — the Danube river
- Linzer biscuit — the city of Linz, Upper Austria
- Hot Wiener — the city of Vienna
- Linzer torte — Linz
- Salzburger Nockerl — the city of Salzburg
- Tyrolean Speck — the County of Tyrol
- Vienna bread — the city of Vienna
- Vienna Fingers and Viennese Whirls — American and British cookies named after Vienna
- Vienna sausage or Wiener — Vienna
- Viennoiserie — Viennese-style baked goods
- Wiener Schnitzel — Vienna
- Wienerbrød — Vienna

==== Czech Republic ====
- Olomoucké tvarůžky or Olmützer cheese — the city of Olomouc, Moravia, Czech Republic
- Moravian spice cookies — the historical country Moravia
- Prague Ham — the city of Prague
- Prasky — sausage named after Prague
- Šumavská topinka — Scrambled eggs on fried bread, named by Šumava forest region (National park)

==== Germany ====
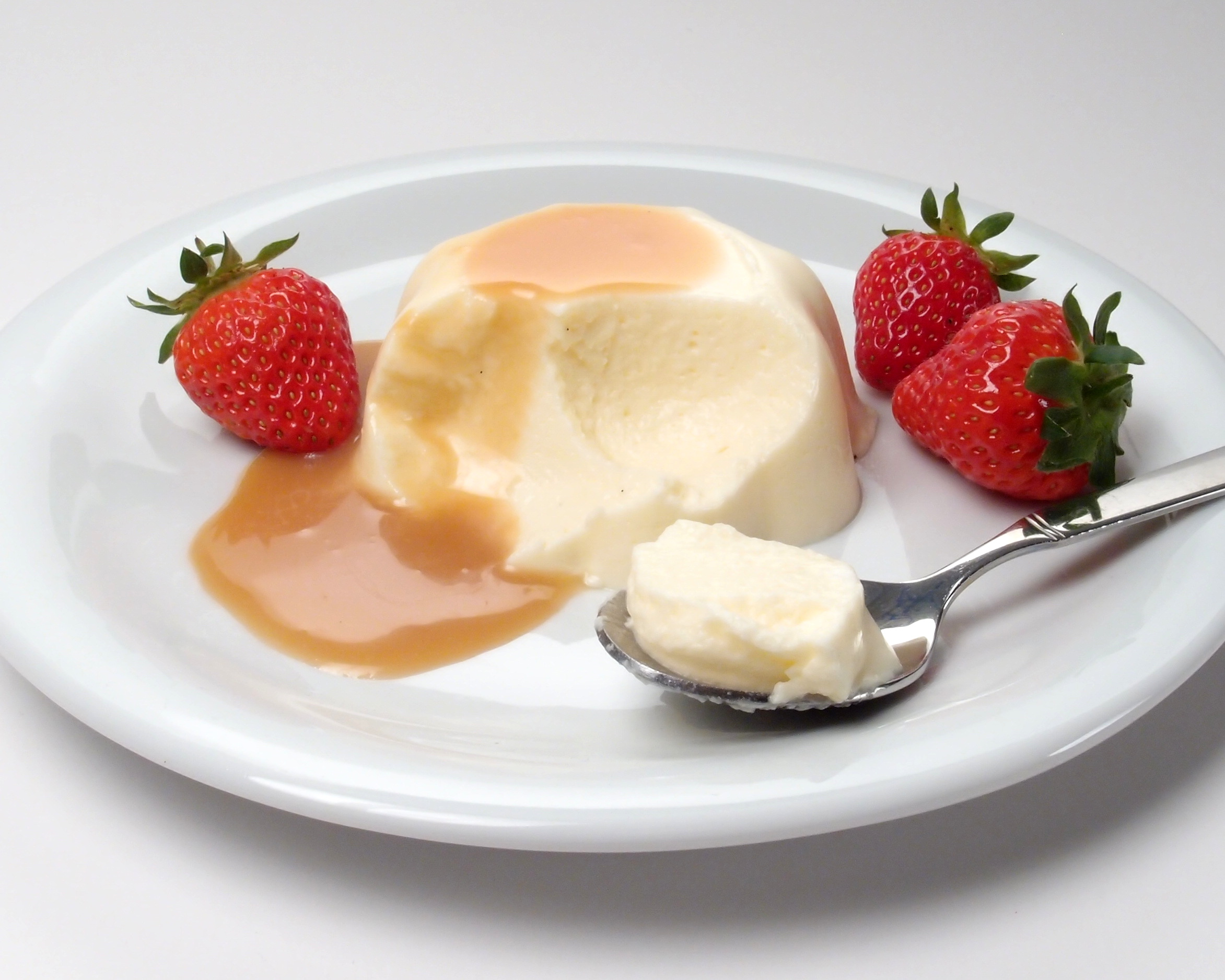
Bavarois

- Allemande sauce — Germany (Allemande in French)
- Bamberg potato — the city of Bamberg, Bavaria
- Bavarois or Bavarian cream — the state of Bavaria
- Frankfurter Grüne Soße — sauce from the city of Frankfurt
- German fries
- German potato pancakes
- Hamburger Aalsuppe — a fish soup from the city of Hamburg
- Hamburg parsley — the city of Hamburg
- Harzer — cheese from the Harz mountain range
- Waldorf salad — via the Waldorf Hotel after the town of Walldorf, Baden, where the Astoria family originated from

Baked goods

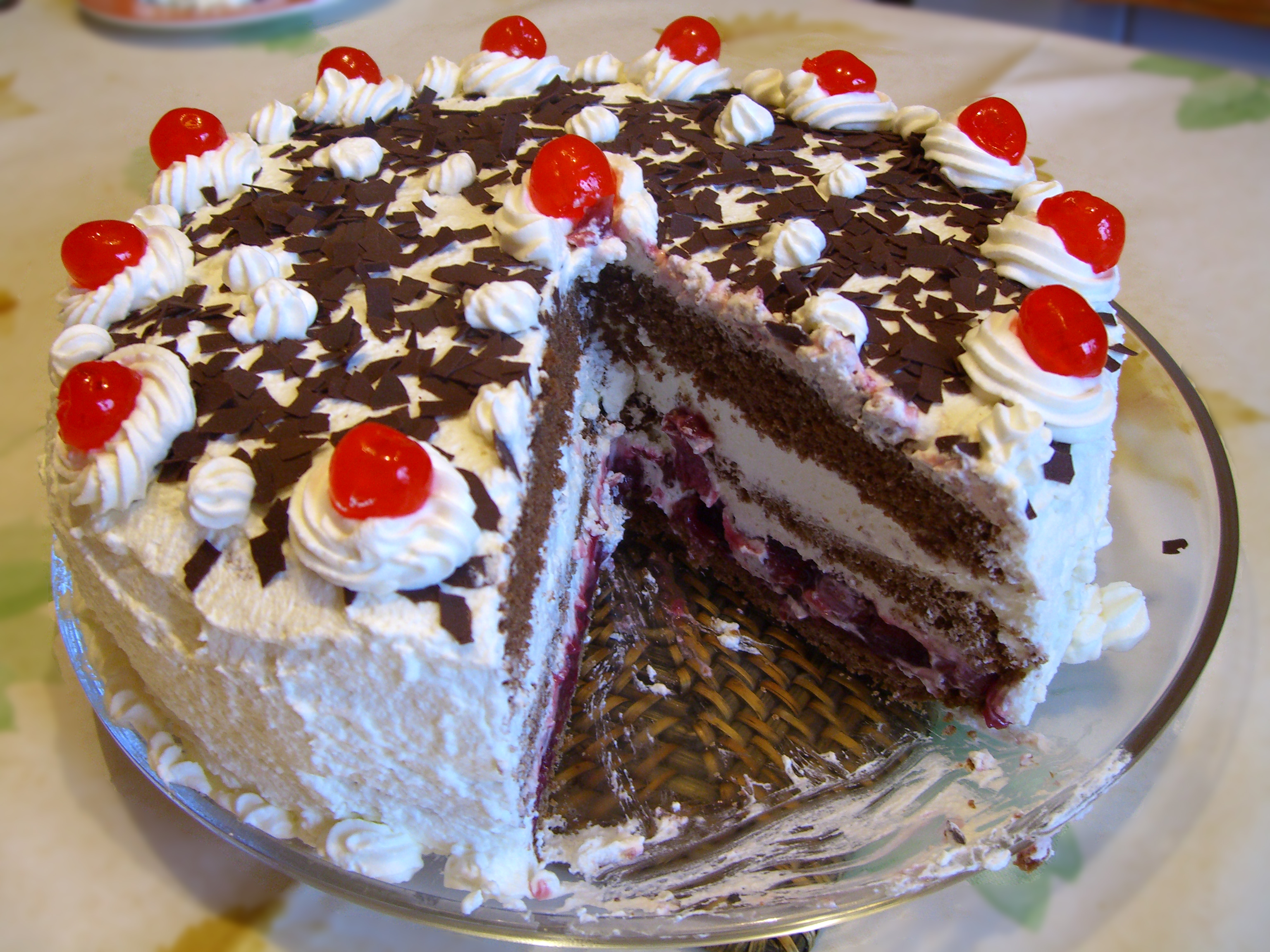
Black Forest cake

- Aachener Printen — gingerbread from the city of Aachen, North Rhine-Westphalia
- Battenberg cake — the town of Battenberg ("Mountbatten"), Hesse
- Berliner — pastry from the city of Berlin
- Black Forest cake or Black Forest gateau — not directly named after the Black Forest mountain range in southwestern Germany, but from the speciality liquor of that region, known as Schwarzwälder Kirsch(wasser) and distilled from tart cherries
- Bremer Klaben — fruit cake from the city of Bremen
- Dutch baby — American pancake perhaps named after the Netherlands, but probably via "deutsch" referring to Germany
- Frankfurter Kranz — cake from the city of Frankfurt, Hesse
- German biscuit
- German toast — Germany
- Leipziger Lerche — pastry from the city of Leipzig, Saxony

Meat products and dishes

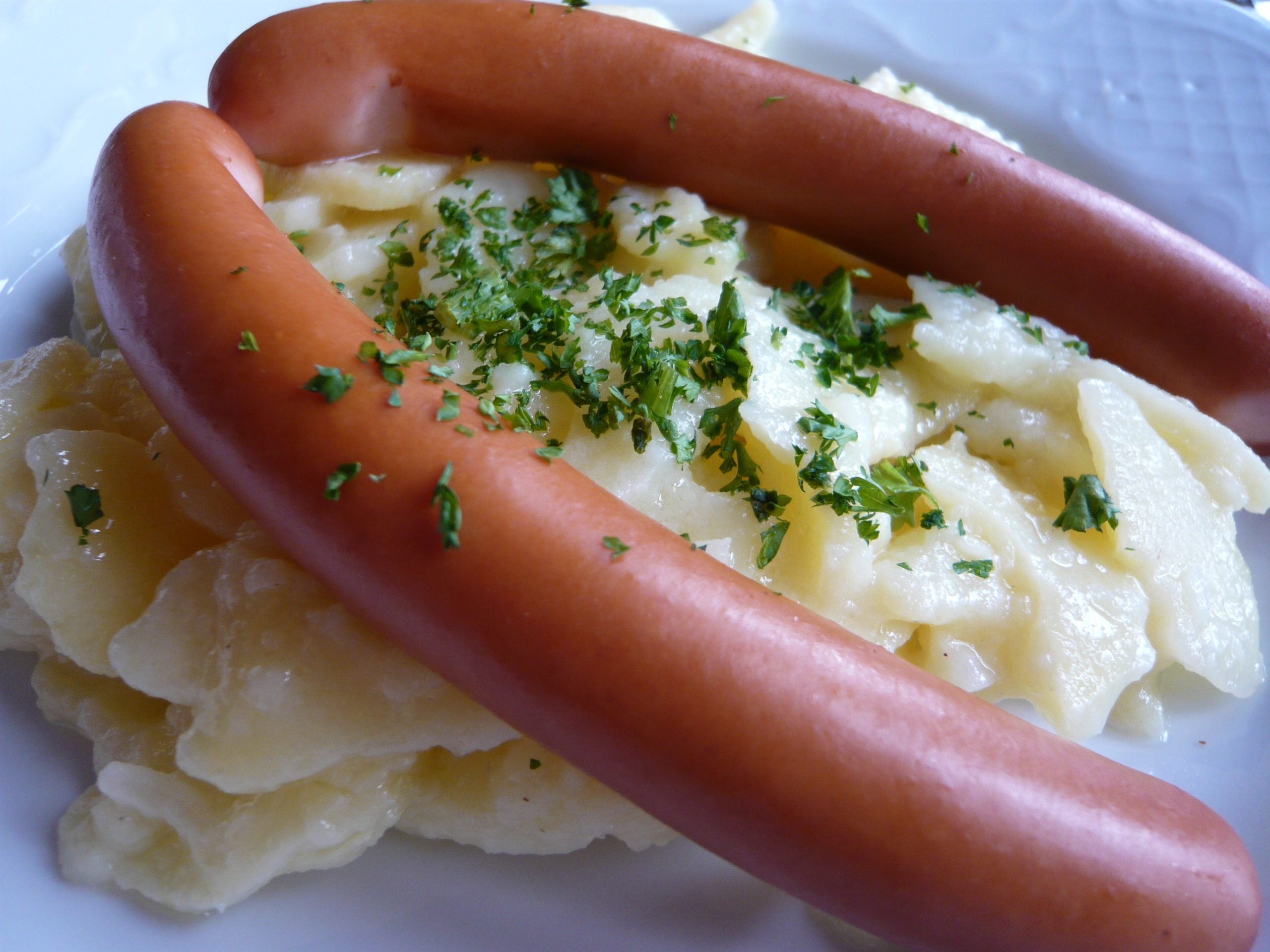
Frankfurter Würstchen

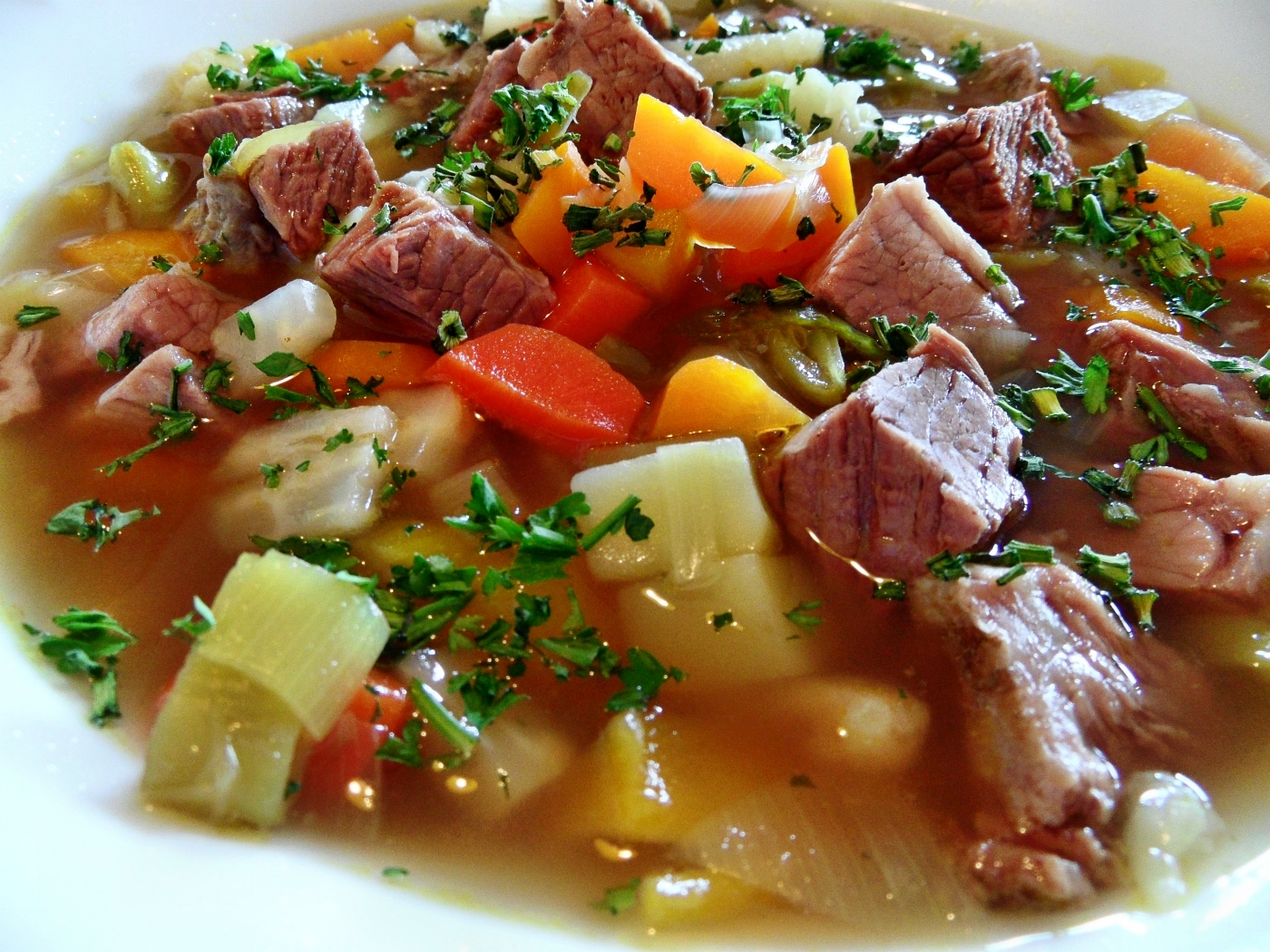
Pichelsteiner

- Ammerländer Schinken — ham from the district of Ammerland, Lower Saxony
- Black Forest ham — the Black Forest mountain range, southwest Germany
- Nürnberger Bratwurst — the city of Nuremberg, Bavaria
- Braunschweiger — sausage from the city of Braunschweig, Lower Saxony
- Brunswick stew — perhaps after Braunschweig (Brunswick)
- Frankfurter, Frankfurter Rindswurst, Frankfurter Würstchen, and Frankfurter Würstel — sausages named for the city of Frankfurt
- Frankfurter Rippchen — pork dish from Frankfurt
- Gaisburger Marsch — beef stew named after the Gaisburg district of Stuttgart
- Hamburg steak and Hamburger — the city of Hamburg
- Königsberger Klopse — meatball dish from the city of Königsberg, now Kaliningrad, a Russian exclave
- Pichelsteiner — stew named after the Büchelstein, a hill in the Bavarian Forest
- Regensburger Wurst — the city of Regensburg, Bavaria
- Thüringer rotwurst — the state of Thuringia
- Westfälische Rinderwurst — the region of Westphalia
- Westphalian ham — the region of Westphalia

==== Hungary ====
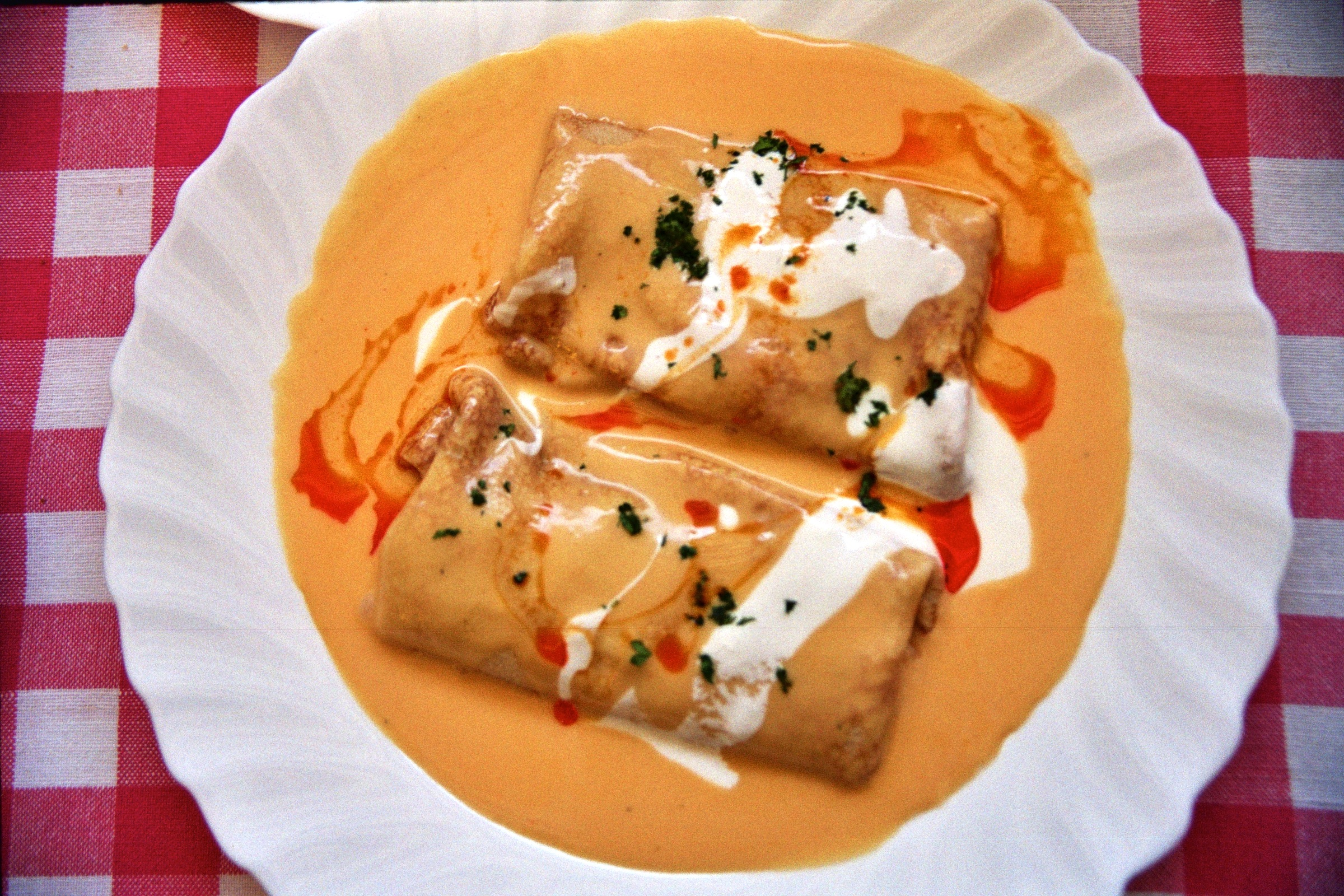
Hortobágyi palacsinta

- Debrecener — sausage named after the city of Debrecen
- Hortobágyi palacsinta — pancake named after the Hortobágy National Park
- Csabai — sausage from the city of Békéscsaba, Békés County
- Gyulai — sausage from the town of Gyula, Békés County
- Hungarian wax pepper
- Hungarian goulash

==== Poland ====
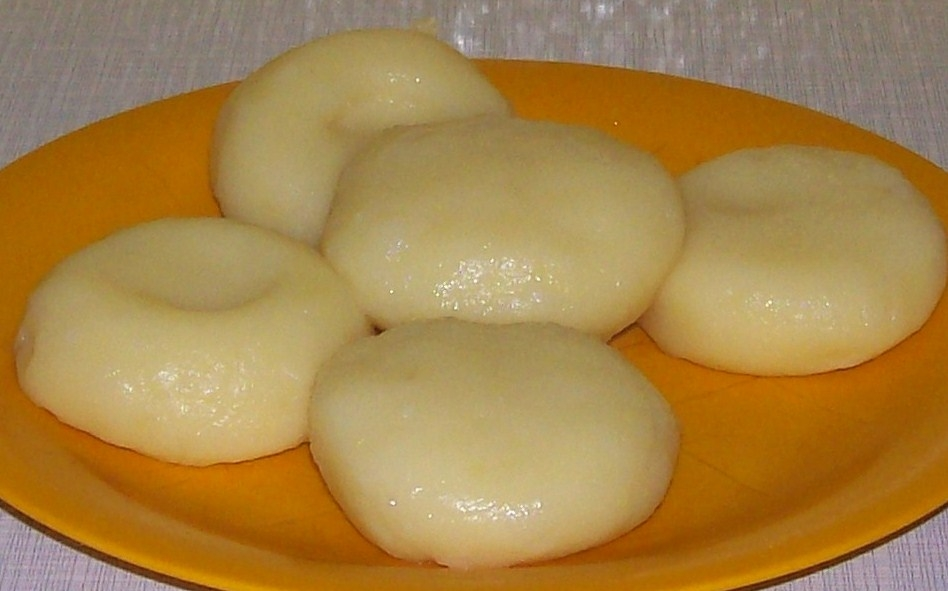
Silesian dumplings

- Bialy — bread roll named after the city of Białystok, Podlaskie
- Korycinski cheese — the town of Korycin, Podlaskie
- '"Krakauer"' or Krakowska — sausage named after the city of Kraków, Lesser Poland
- Obwarzanek krakowski — another bread named after Kraków
- Paprykarz szczeciński— fish spread named after the city of Szczecin, West Pomerania
- Pasztecik szczeciński — deep fried pie from Szczecin
- Polish Boy — American sausage sandwich
- Polish sausage
- Silesian dumplings — the Silesia region of Central Europe
- Toruń gingerbread or Thorner Lebkuchen — the city of Toruń, Pomerania

==== Slovakia ====
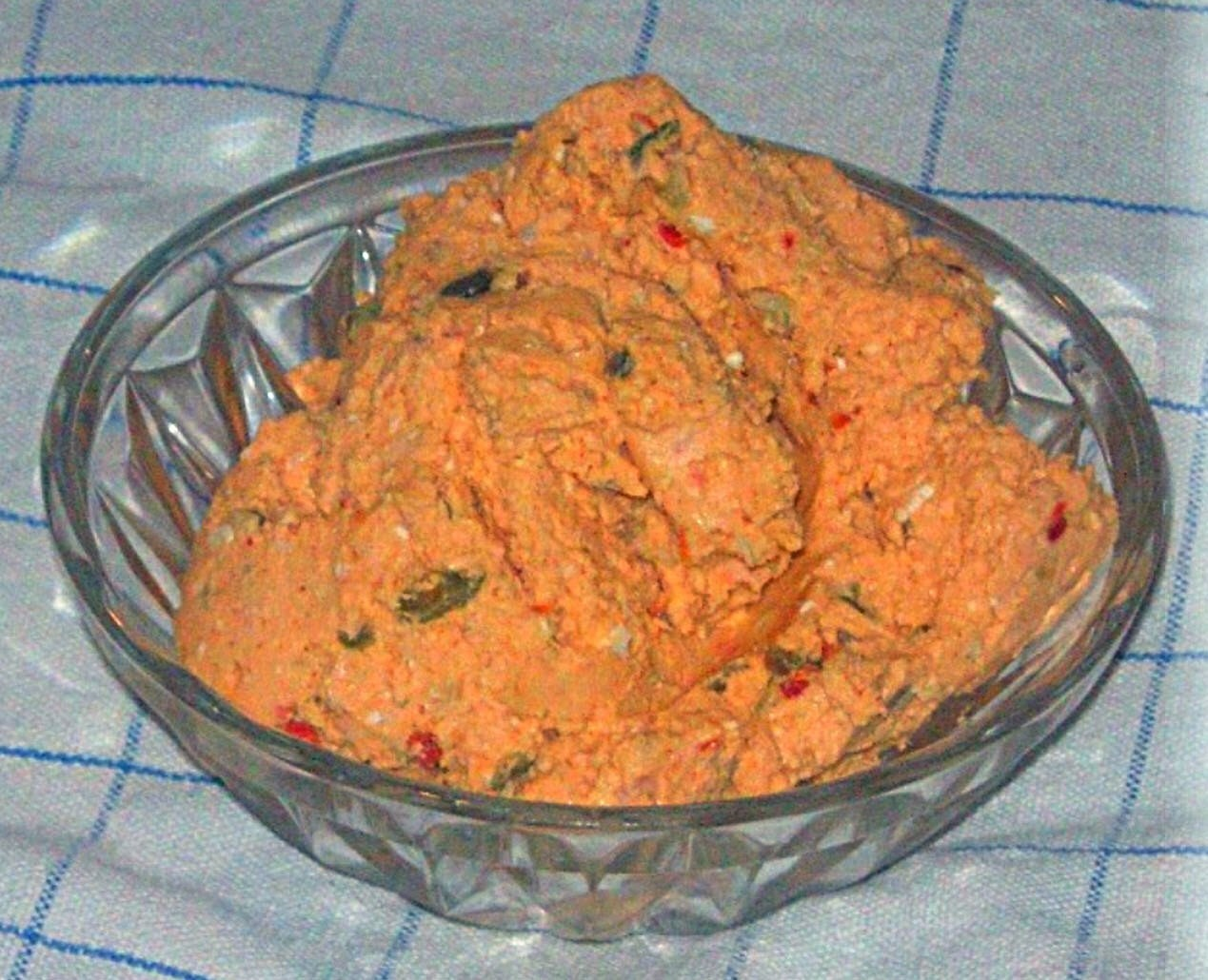
Liptauer

- Pozsonyi kifli — Hungarian pastry named after the Slovak city of Bratislava ("Pozsonyi" in Hungarian)
- Liptauer — cheese spread named after the historical region of Liptov, Slovakia
- Skalický trdelník — dough wrapped around a stick, baked and topped with sugary mix, named after the city Skalica

==== Slovenia ====
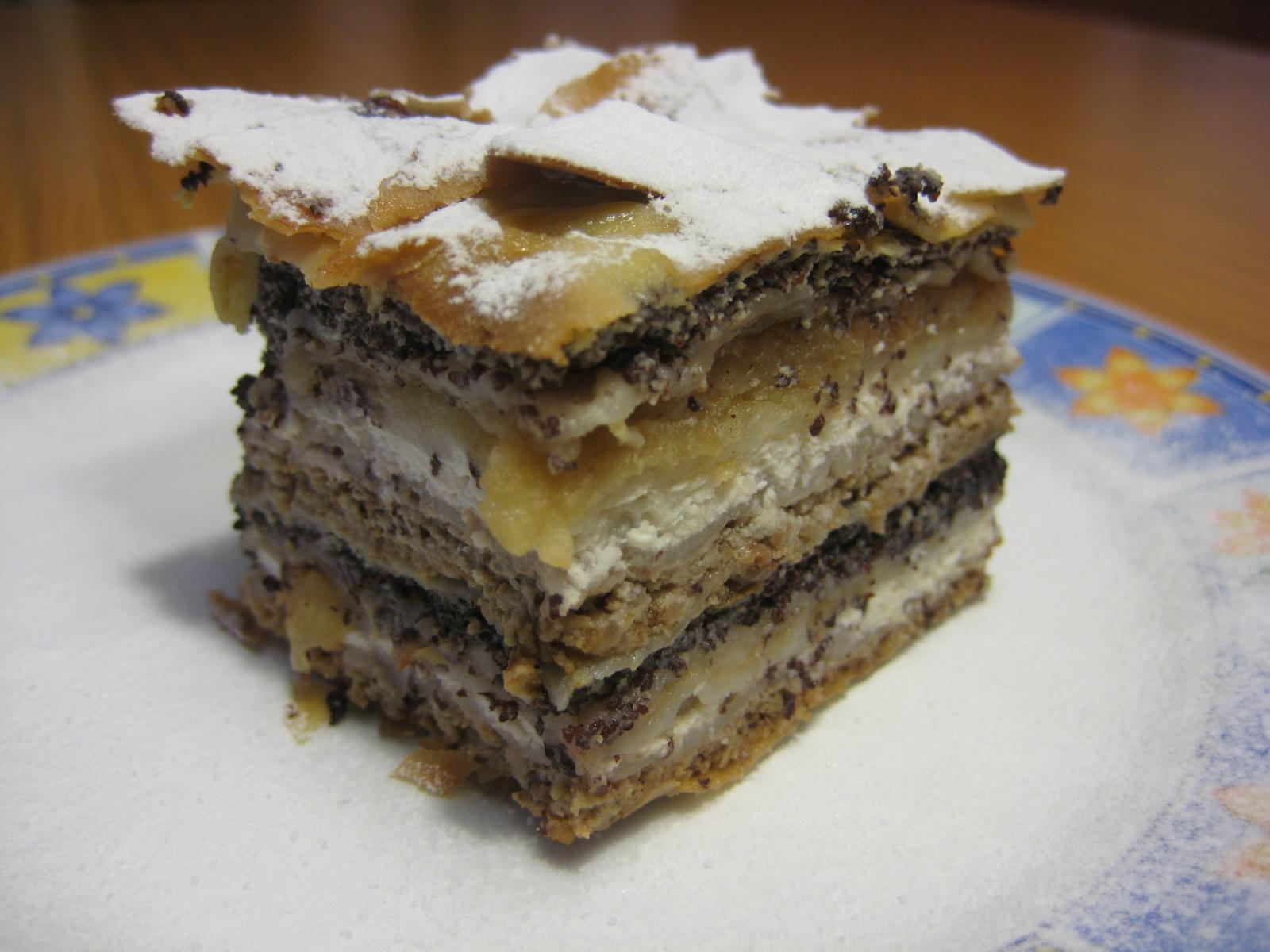
Prekmurje layer pastry

- Belokranjska povitica — cake from the Bela Krajina (White Carniola) region
- Carniolan sausage — the historical region of Carniola
- Idrijski žlikrofi — dumplings from the town of Idrija
- Prekmurska gibanica or Prekmurje layer pastry — pastry from the Prekmurje region

==== Switzerland ====
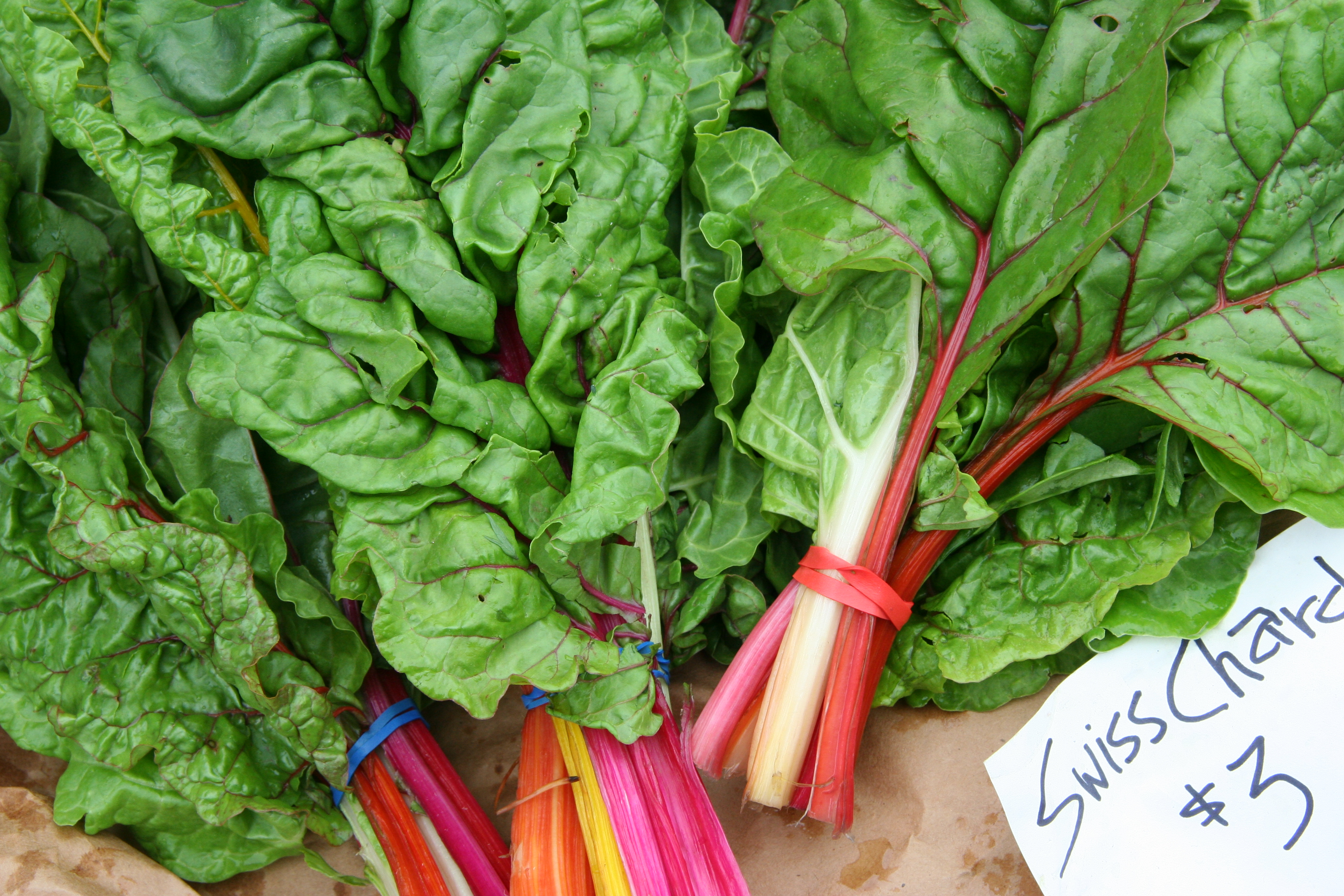
Swiss chard

- Bündnerfleisch — dried meat from the canton of Graubünden
- Swiss chard
- Zürcher Geschnetzeltes — meat dish from the city of Zürich

Baked goods

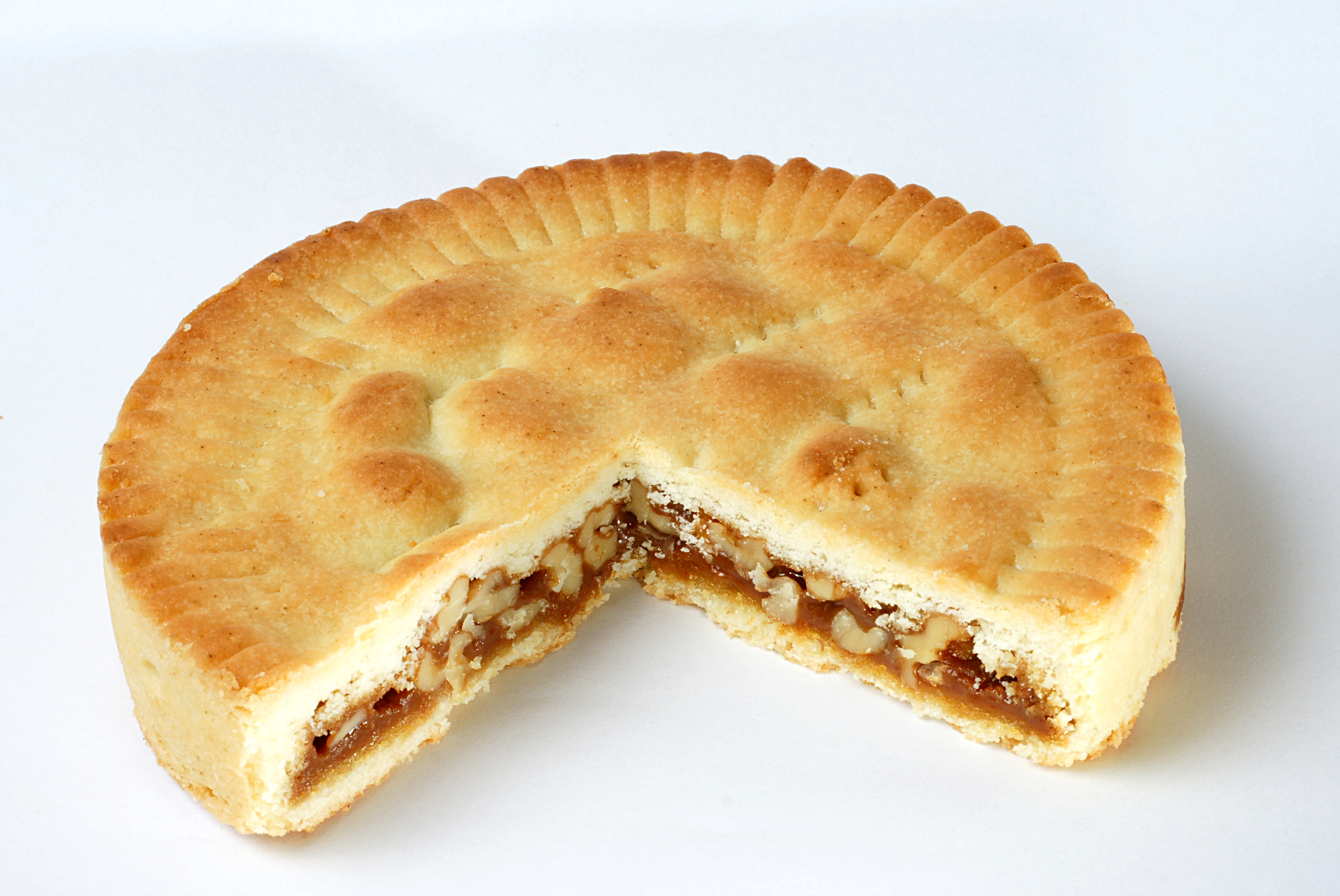
Bündner Nusstorte

- Basler Brot and Basler Läckerli — bread and cookies from the city of Basel
- Berner Haselnusslebkuchen and Berner Honiglebkuchen — cakes from the city of Bern
- Bündner Nusstorte or Engadiner Nusstorte — sweet pastry from (the Engadin region of) the Graubünden canton
- Couque suisse — Belgian sweet roll
- Pain de seigle valaisan — bread from the canton of Valais
- Pane ticinese — bread from the canton of Ticino, Switzerland
- Papet vaudois — mashed potatoes and leek from the canton of Vaud
- Swiss roll
- Zuger Kirschtorte — layer cake from the city or canton of Zug, Switzerland
- Zürcher Murren — bread roll from the city of Zürich

Cheeses

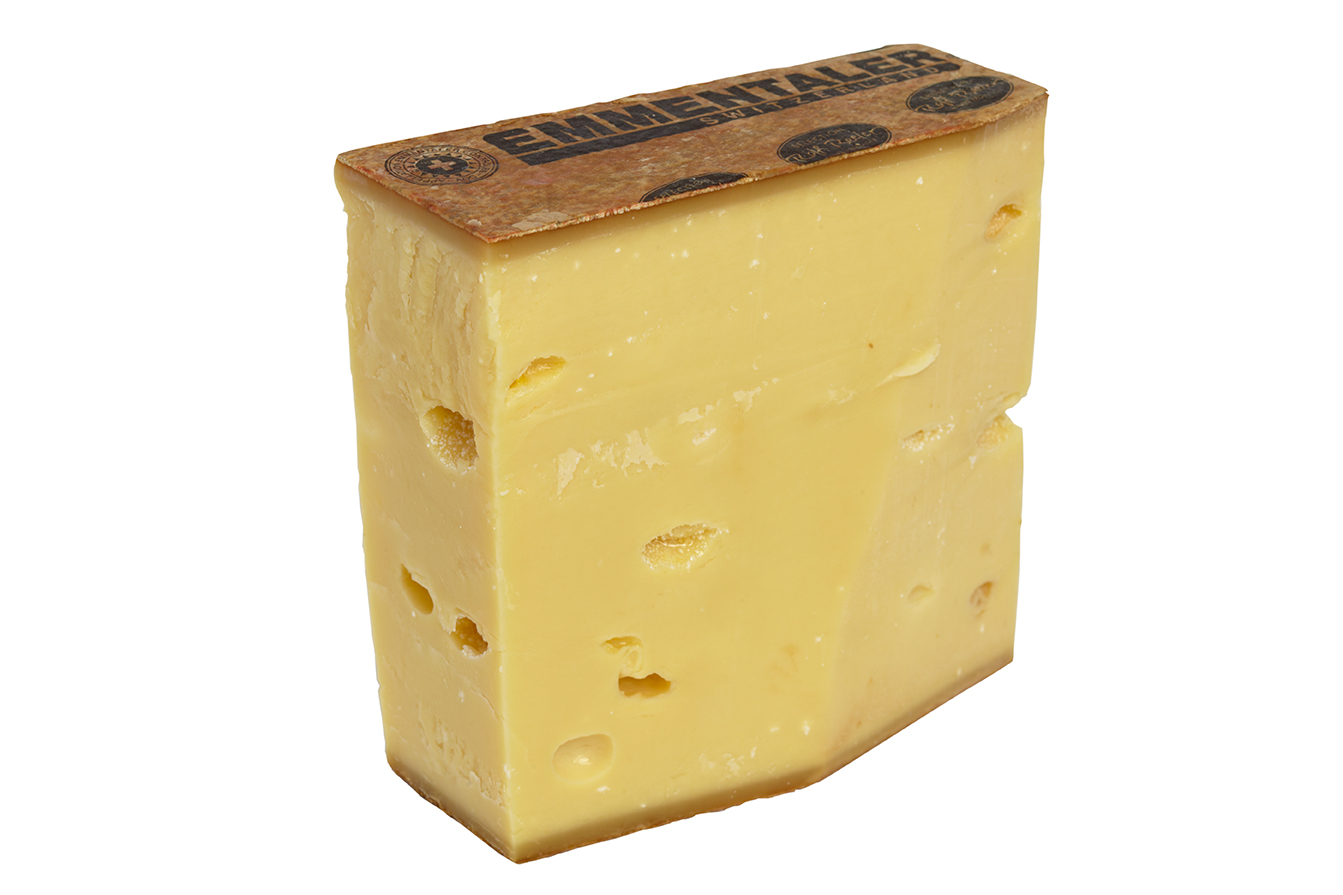
Emmental cheese

- Appenzeller — the canton of Appenzell
- Berner Alpkäse and Berner Hobelkäse — the Bernese Oberland region
- Emmentaler — Emmental, the name of a valley in the canton of Bern
- Gruyère — the town of Gruyères in the canton of Fribourg
- L'Etivaz — the hamlet of L'Etivaz in the canton of Vaud
- Swiss cheese — American cheese named for its resemblance to Emmental cheese
- Tomme Vaudoise — the canton of Vaud
- Vacherin Fribourgeois — the canton of Fribourg

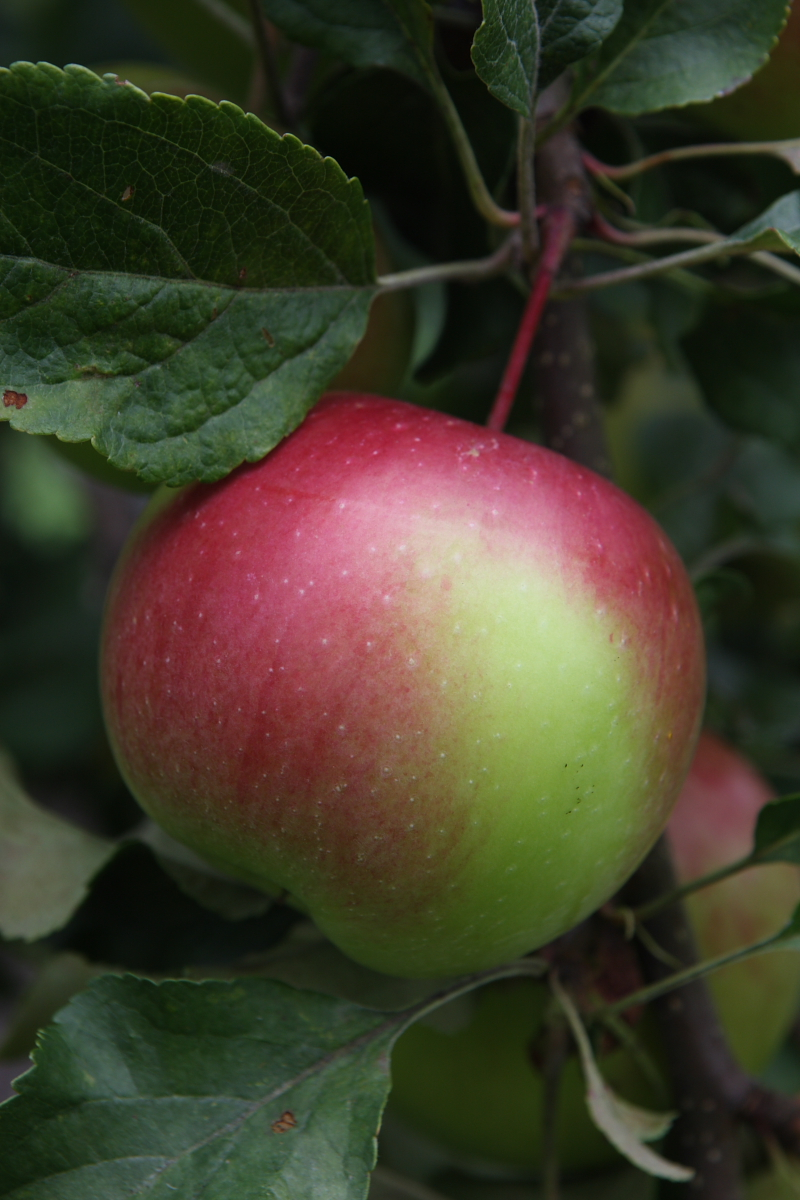
Tartu Rose

=== Eastern Europe ===
==== Baltic states ====
- Liveland Raspberry apple — the Governorate of Livonia ("Livland" in German), now part of Latvia and Estonia
- Tartu Rose — apple named after the city of Tartu, Estonia

==== Russia ====
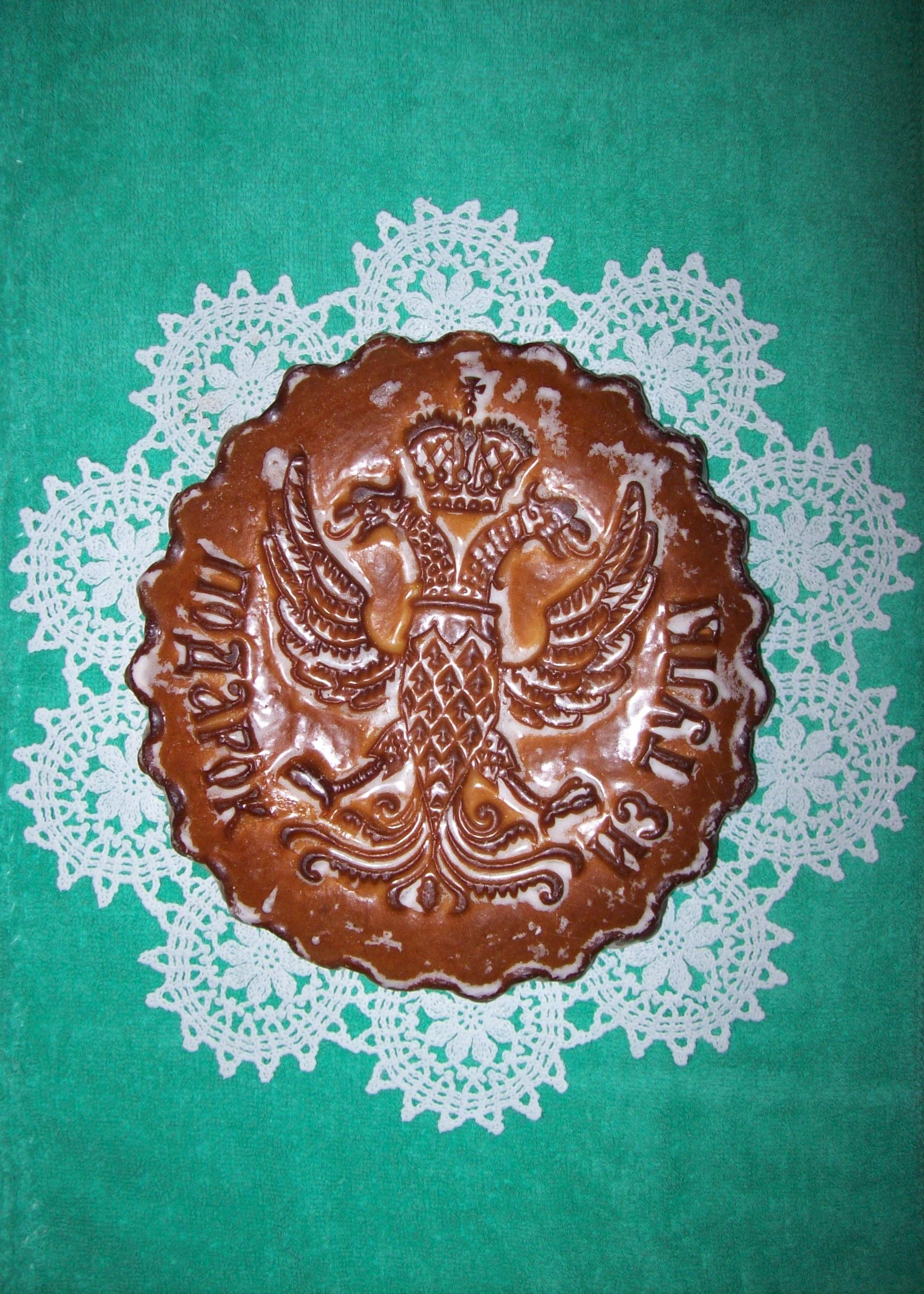
Tula pryanik

- Amur grape — the Amur River
- Borodinsky bread — the village of Borodino, Moscow Oblast
- Circassian cheese — the historical region of Circassia in the North Caucasus
- Circassian chicken — Circassia
- Red Astrachan apple — the city or oblast of Astrachan
- Ruske kape — Balkan cakes named "Russian hats"
- Russian candy or Russian chocolate
- Russian dressing
- Russian salad
- Russian tea cake
- Siberian tomato — American tomato named after Siberia for its cold resistance
- Tilsit cheese — the town of Tilsit in East Prussia (now Sovetsk)
- Tula pryanik — the city of Tula, western Russia
- Vologda butter — the Vologda region

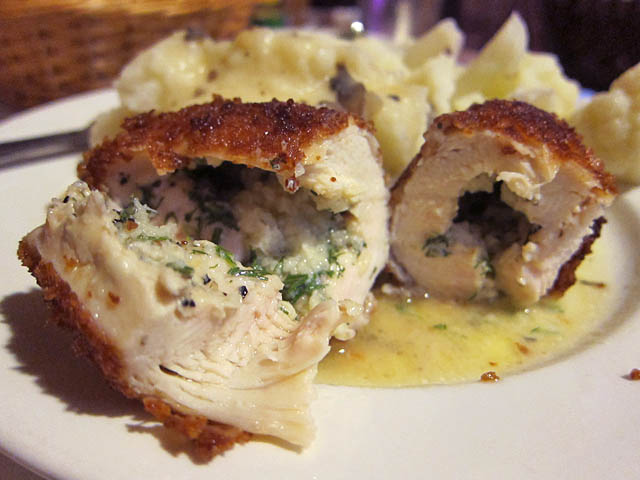
Chicken Kiev

==== Ukraine ====
- Black Krim — a tomato from the Crimea peninsula
- Chicken Kiev — the city of Kyiv
- Kyiv cake — the city of Kyiv
- Griotte de Kleparow— a cherry from the historical area of Klepariv, now a suburb of the city of Lviv
- Potato Ulanov — fried potato from the village of Ulanov, Vinnytsia Oblast

=== Nordic countries ===
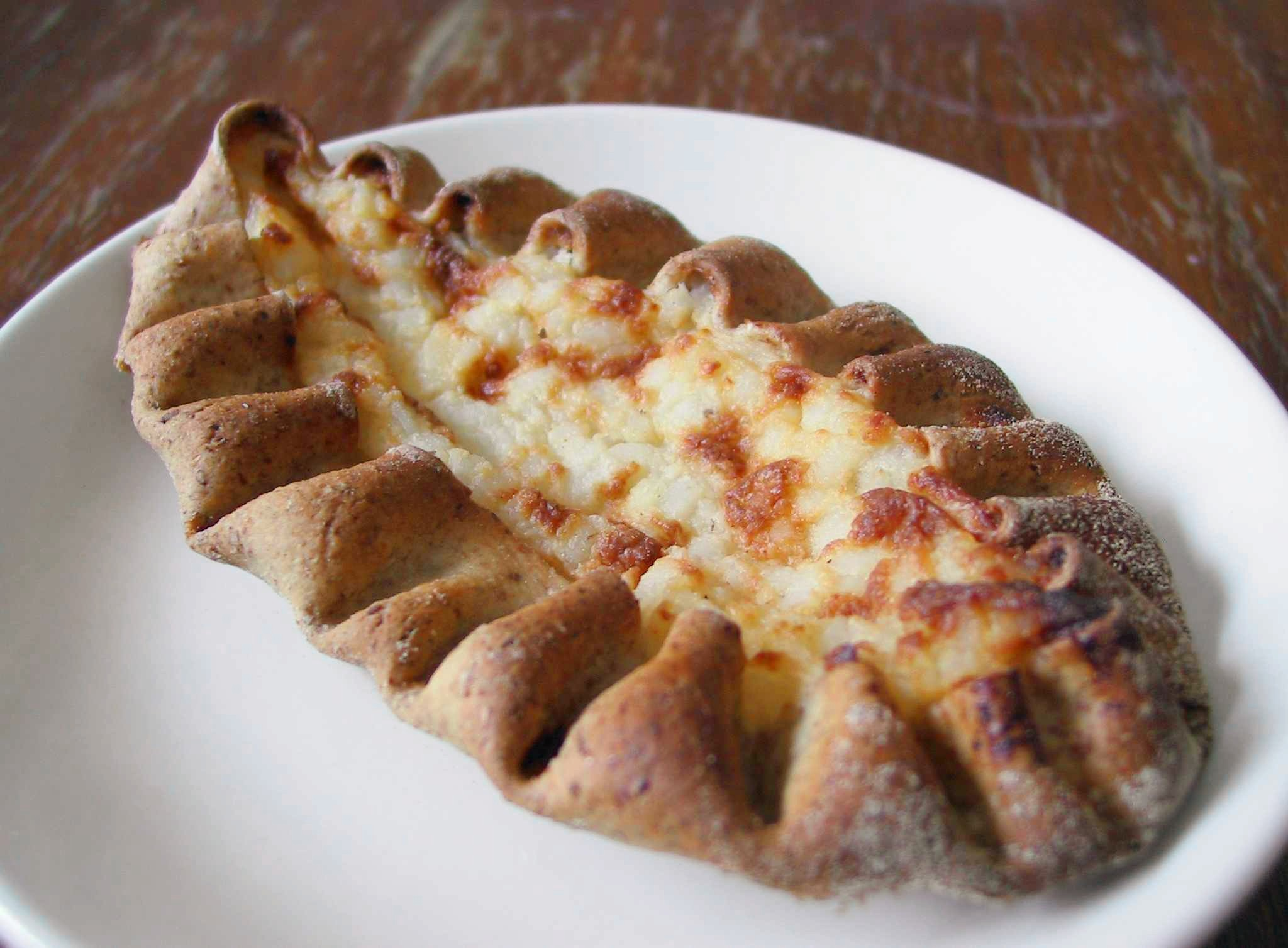
Karelian pasty

- Faroese puffin — poultry from the Faroe Islands
- Karelian hot pot or Karelian stew — from Karelia, a region in Russia and Finland
- Karelian pasties — Karelia
- Lappi cheese — the Lapland region of Finland
- Turun sinappi or Åbo senap — brand of mustard named after the city of Turku / Åbo, Finland

==== Norway ====
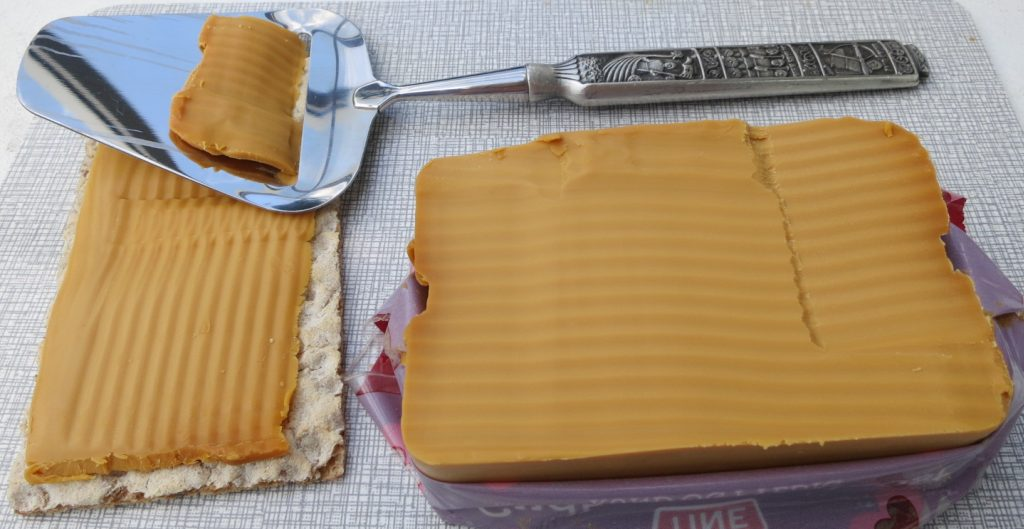
Gudbrandsdalsost

- Bergen fish soup — the city of Bergen, Hordaland
- Bergenost — American cheese brand named after the city of Bergen
- Gudbrandsdalsost — cheese from the Gudbrand Valley, Oppland
- Jarlsberg cheese — the former county of Jarlsberg, now part of Vestfold
- Norvegia cheese — Norway

==== Sweden ====
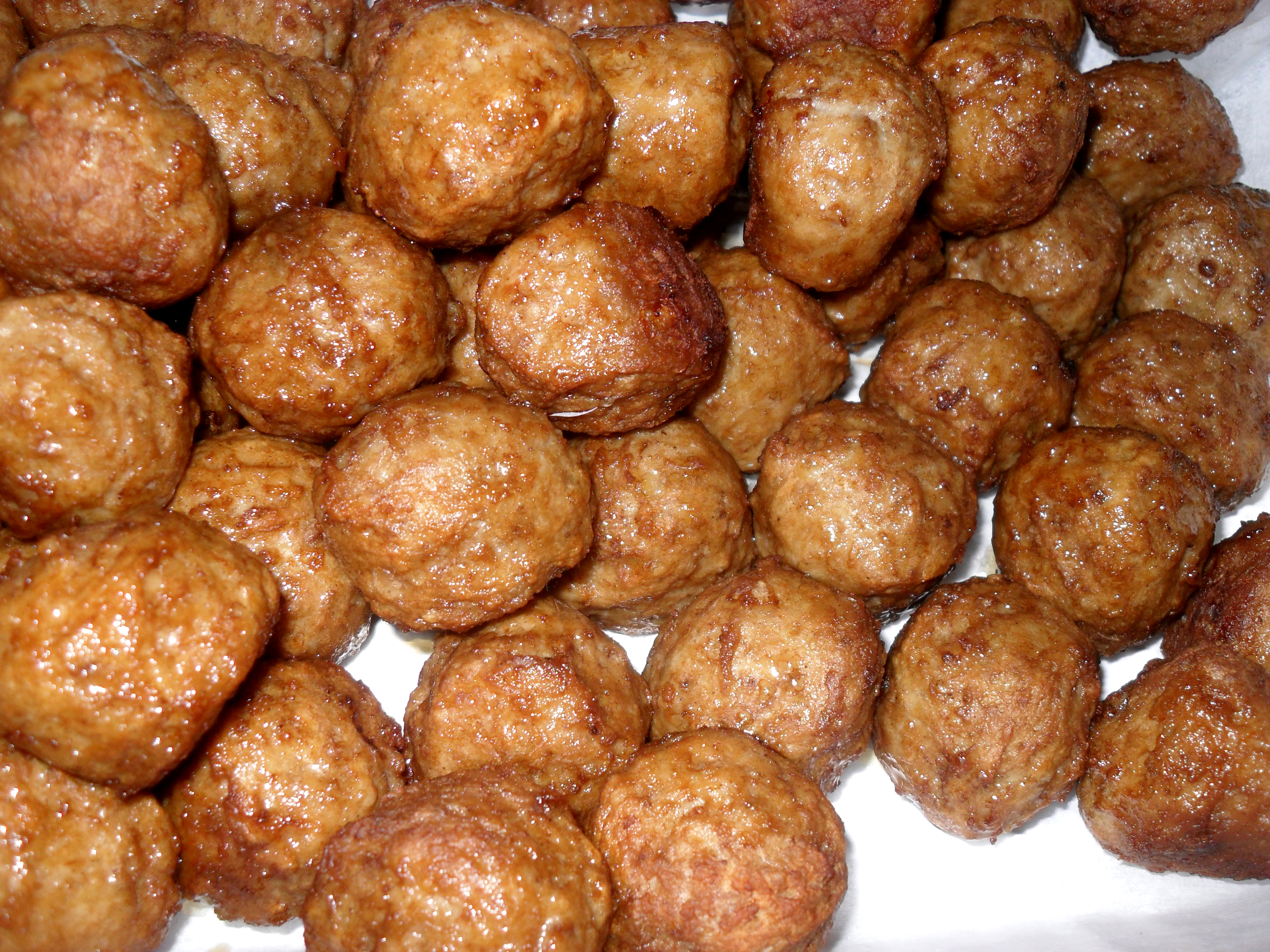
Swedish meatballs

- Åkerö apple — the Åkerö Manor, Södermanland
- Falukorv — sausage named after the city of Falun, Dalarna County
- Gotland Blue cheese — the island province of Gotland
- Kalmar Glasäpple — the city of Kalmar, Kalmar County
- Scanian eggcake — the southern province of Scania
- Svecia cheese — Sweden
- Swede
- Swedish fruit soup
- Swedish meatballs
- Swedish pancakes
- Västerbotten cheese — the northern province of Västerbotten (West Botnia)

=== Southern Europe ===
- Gibraltar rock — American candy named after the Rock of Gibraltar on the southern Iberian Peninsula
- Jamón ibérico — "Iberian ham"
- Monte Carlo — British cookie named after the city of Monte Carlo, Monaco
- Torta Tre Monti — the three peaks of Monte Titano, San Marino

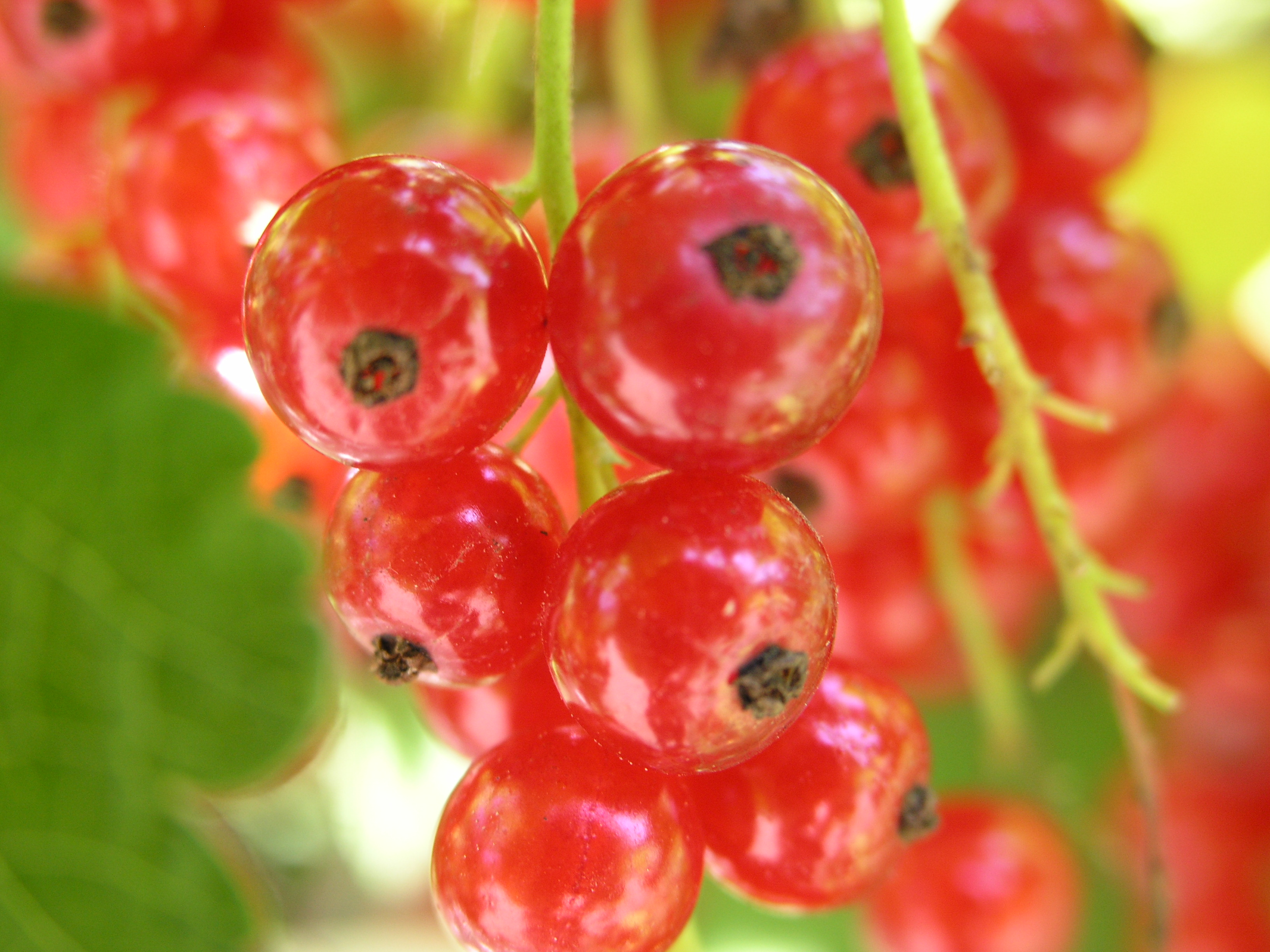
Redcurrant

==== Greece ====
- Arroz à grega — Brazilian rice dish named after Greece
- Fenugreek — herb named "hay of Greece"
- Graviera — cheese from the region of Agrafa on Crete
- Greek pizza
- Greek Yoghurt — a yoghurt that has been strained to remove its whey, also "Greek-style Yoghurt"
- Metsovone — cheese from the region of Metsovo in Epirus
- Psarosoupa patmou — fish soup from the island of Patmos

Fruits and vegetables

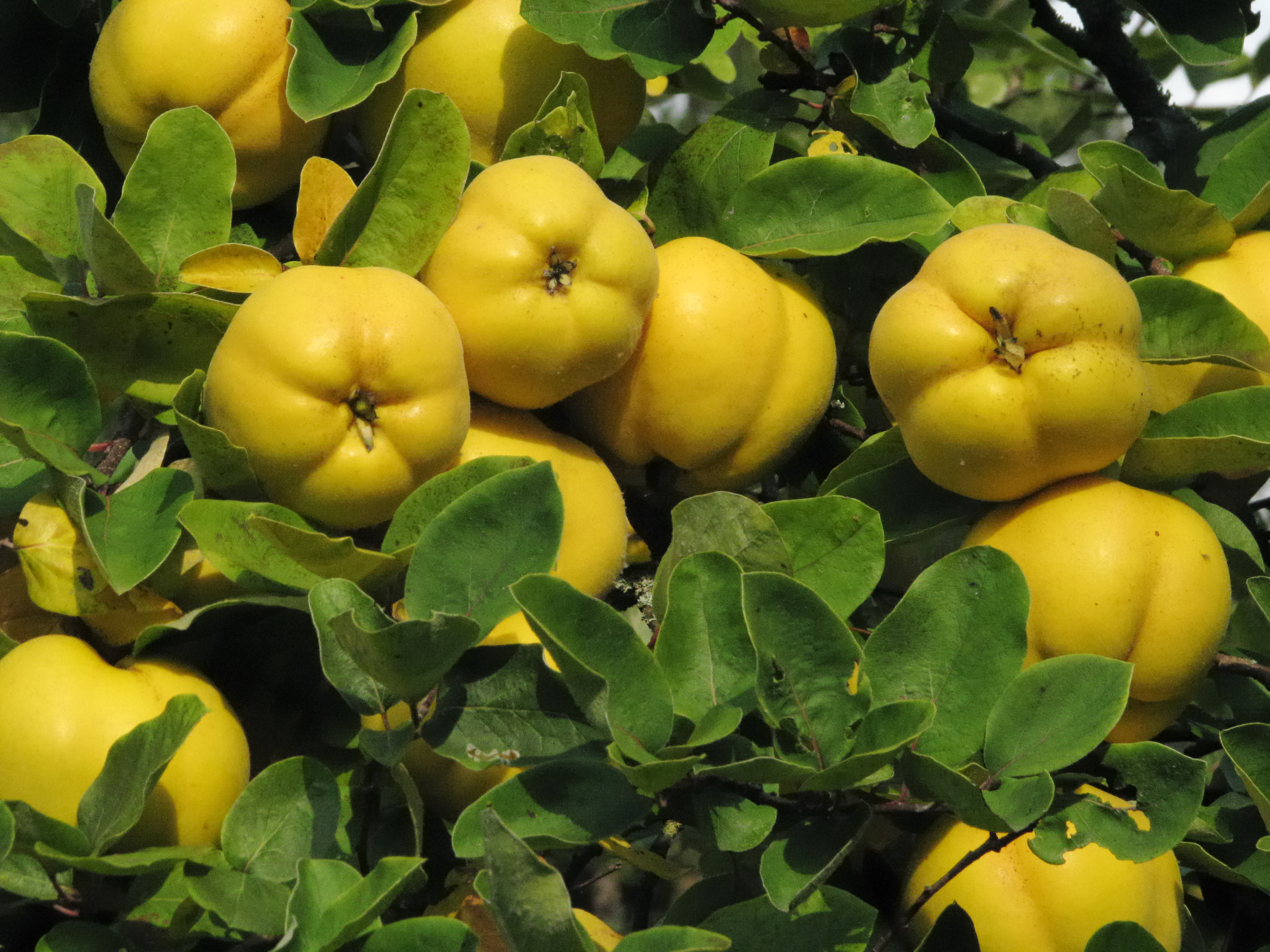
Quinces

- Currant (e.g. Blackcurrant, Redcurrant, Whitecurrant) — the city of Corinth, Peloponnese
- Golden Greek pepper
- Greek citron
- Kalamata olive — the city of Kalamata, Peloponnese
- Quince — the ancient city-state of Kydonia, Crete
- Santorini tomato — the island of Santorini
- Spartan apple — the ancient city-state of Sparta
- Zante currant — the Ionian island of Zante and the city of Corinth, Peloponnese

==== Italy ====
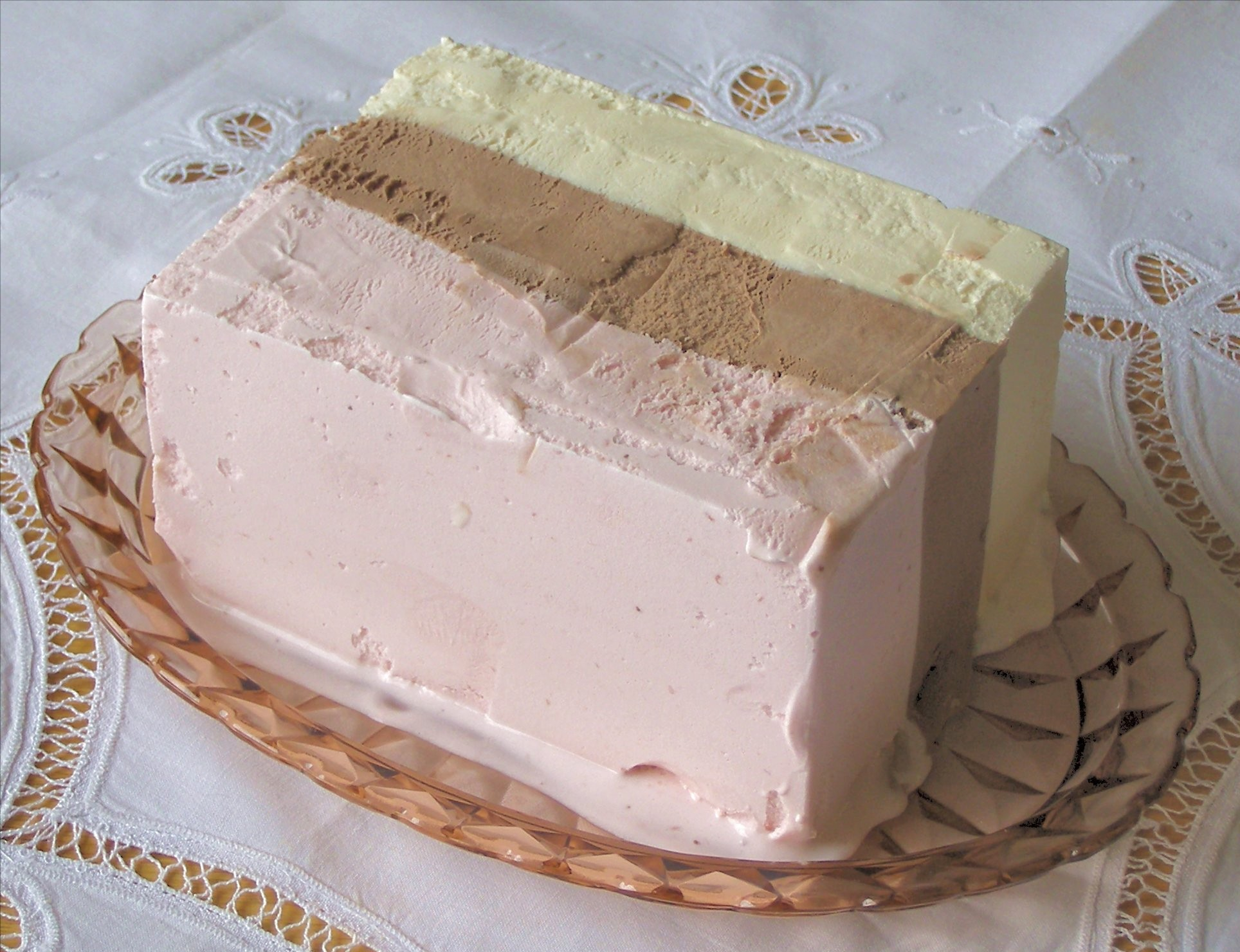
Neapolitan ice cream

- Arborio rice — the town of Arborio, Piedmont
- Baccalà alla lucana — fish dish from Basilicata, in the past known as Lucania
- Baccalà alla vicentina — fish dish from the city of Vicenza, Veneto
- Eggs Florentine — the city of Florence, Tuscany
- Italian ice
- Naporitan — Japanese dish named after the city of Naples
- Neapolitan ice cream — the city of Naples
- Prosecco - a sparkling white wine named after the town of Prosecco
- Sardines — the island of Sardinia

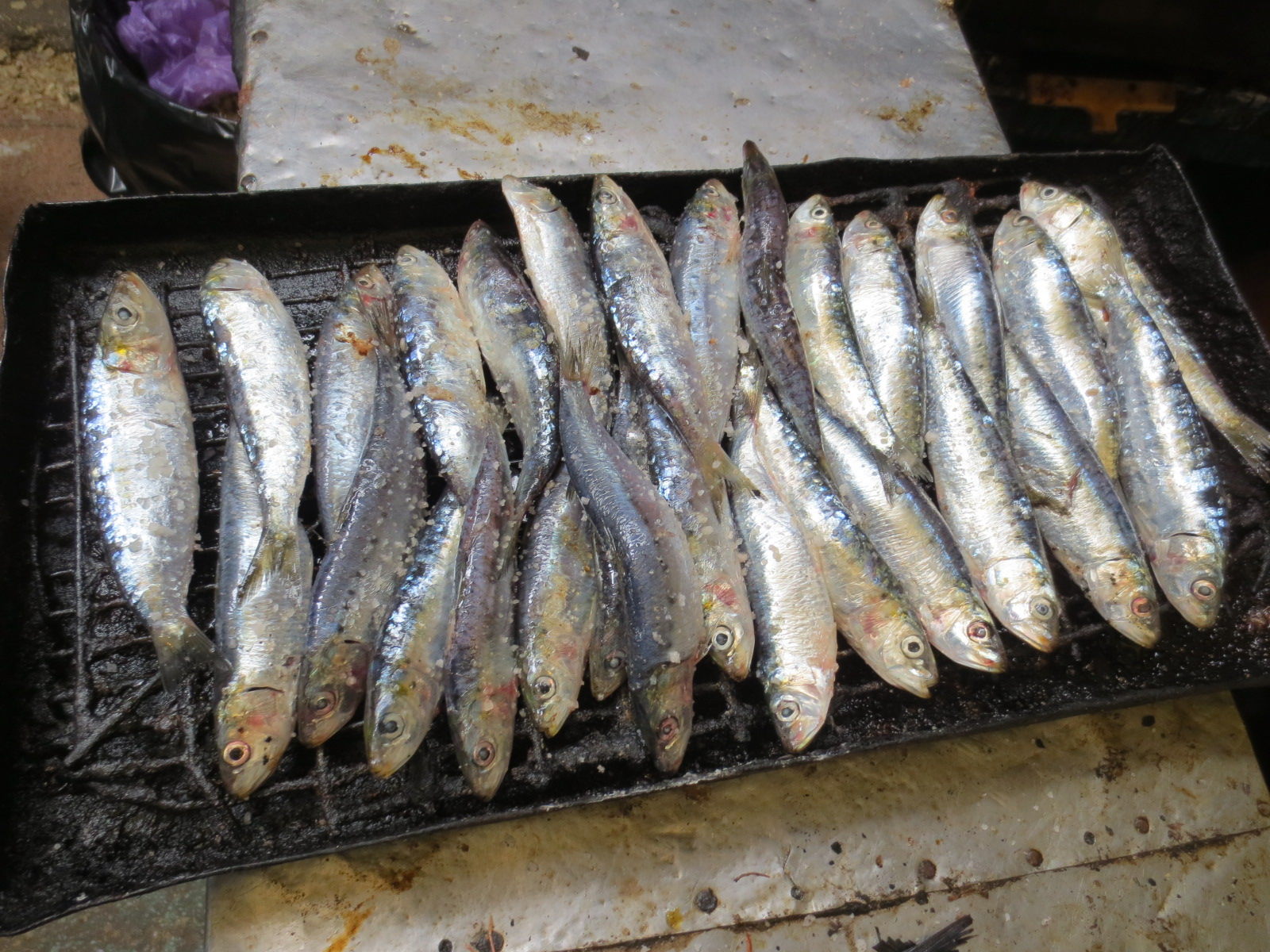
Sardines

Baked goods

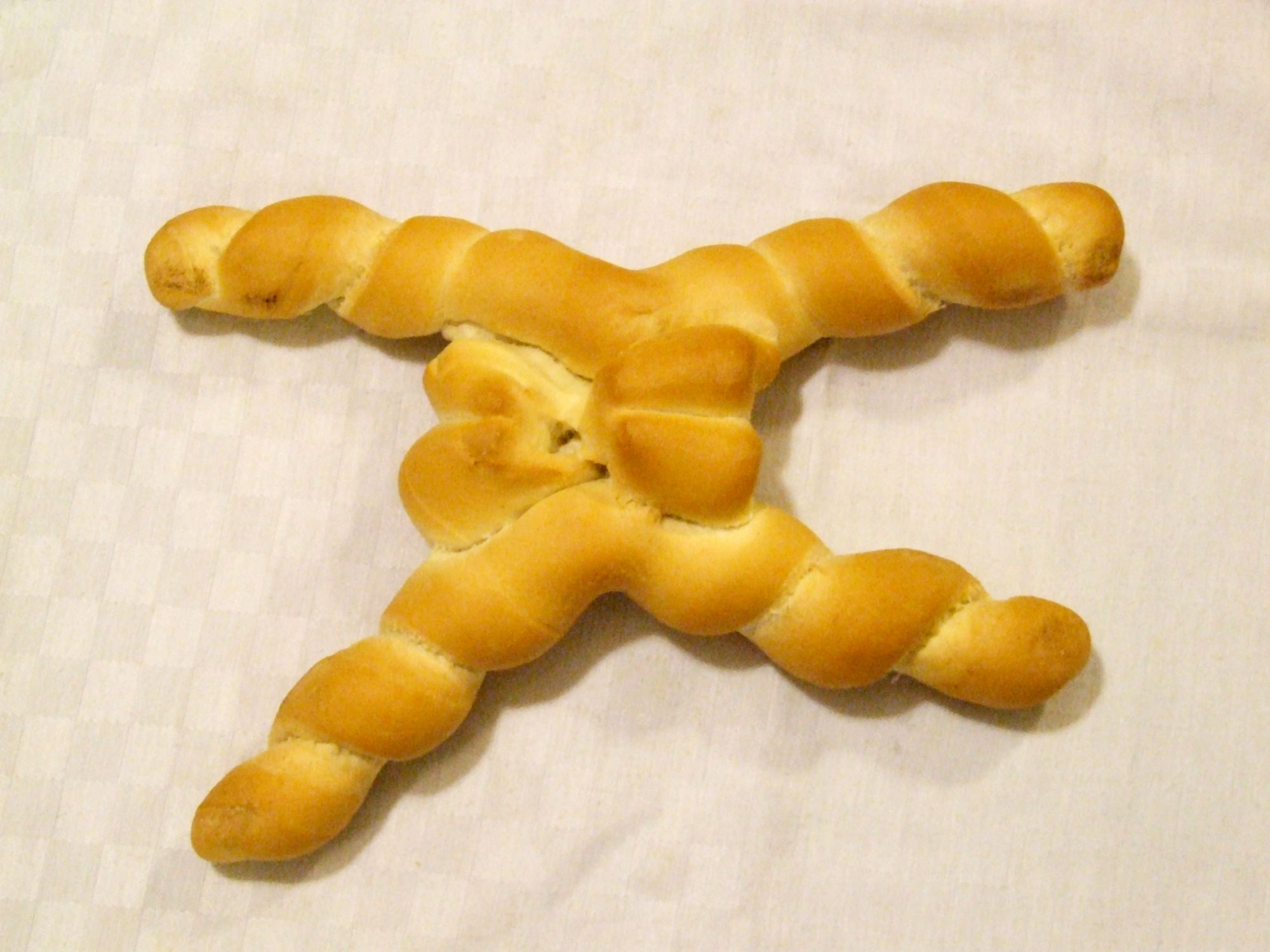
Coppia ferrarese

- Amaretti di Saronno — cookie from Saronno, Lombardy
- Buccellato di Lucca — cake from the city of Lucca, Tuscany
- Coppia ferrarese — bread from the Province of Ferrara
- Crocetta of Caltanissetta — sweets from the Province of Caltanissetta
- Florentine Biscuit — the city of Florence, Tuscany
- Genoa cake and Genoise or Genovese cake — the city of Genoa, Liguria
- Italian sandwich
- Italian tomato pie
- Neapolitan pizza and Neapolitan wafer — the city of Naples
- Nocciolini di Canzo — cookies from the town of Canzo, Lombardy
- Nocciolini di Chivasso — cookies from the town of Chivasso in the metropolitan area of Turin, Piedmont
- Pane di Altamura — bread from the city of Altamura, Apulia
- Pane toscano — bread from the Tuscany region
- Pizza pugliese — the Apulia region of southeast Italy
- Sicilian pizza — the island of Sicily
- Stromboli — pizza named via the film Stromboli — the island of Stromboli
- Torta alla Monferrina — the Montferrat region of Piedmont
- Torta caprese — the island of Capri, Campania

Cheeses

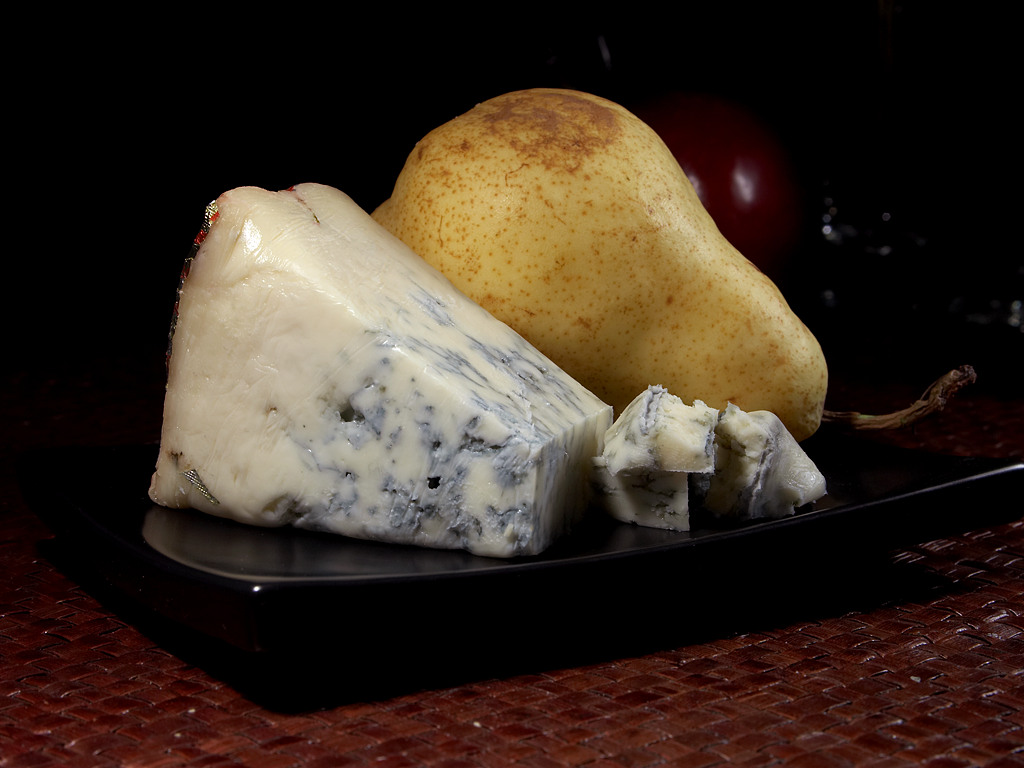
Gorgonzola and a pear

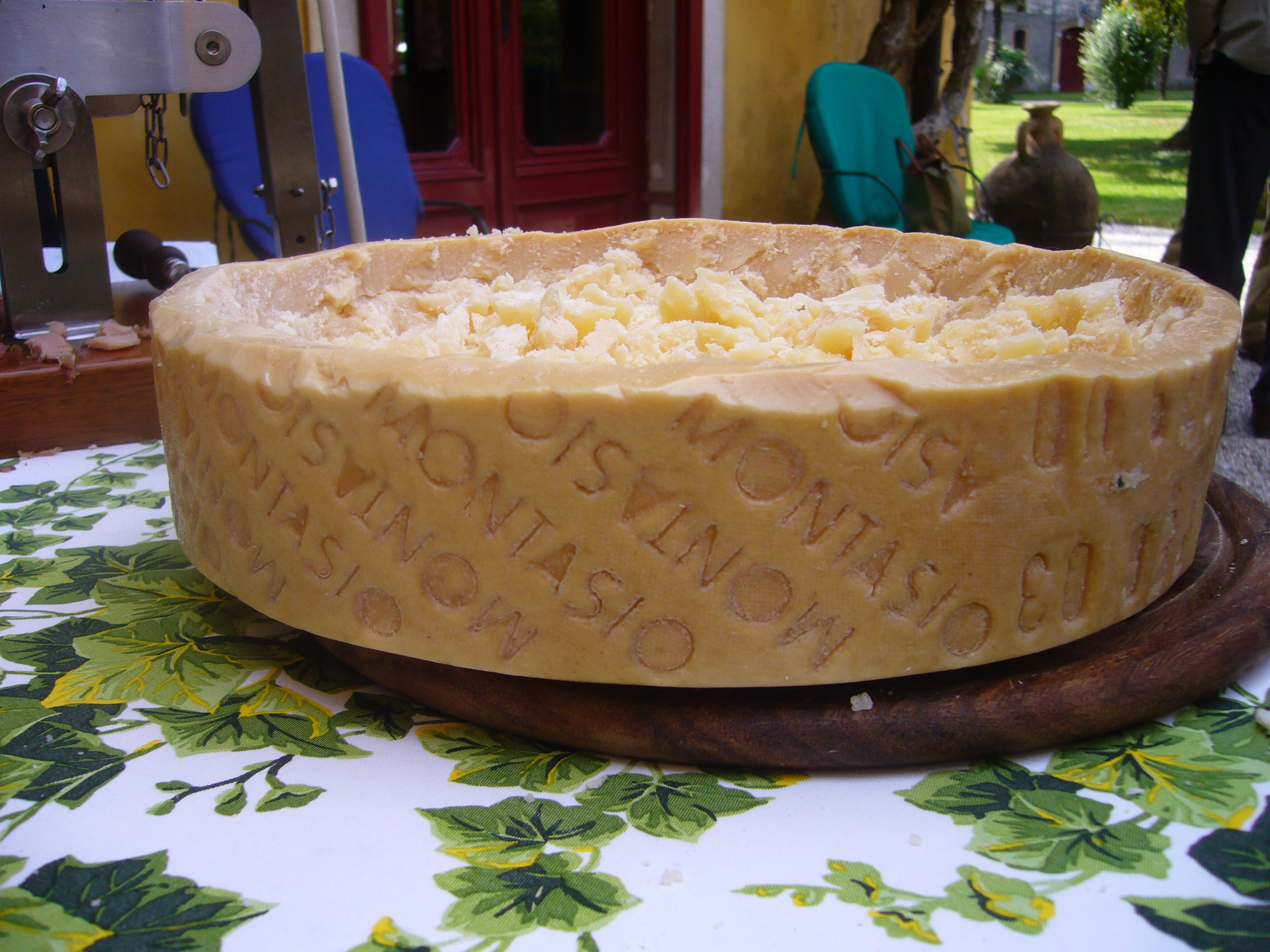
Montasio

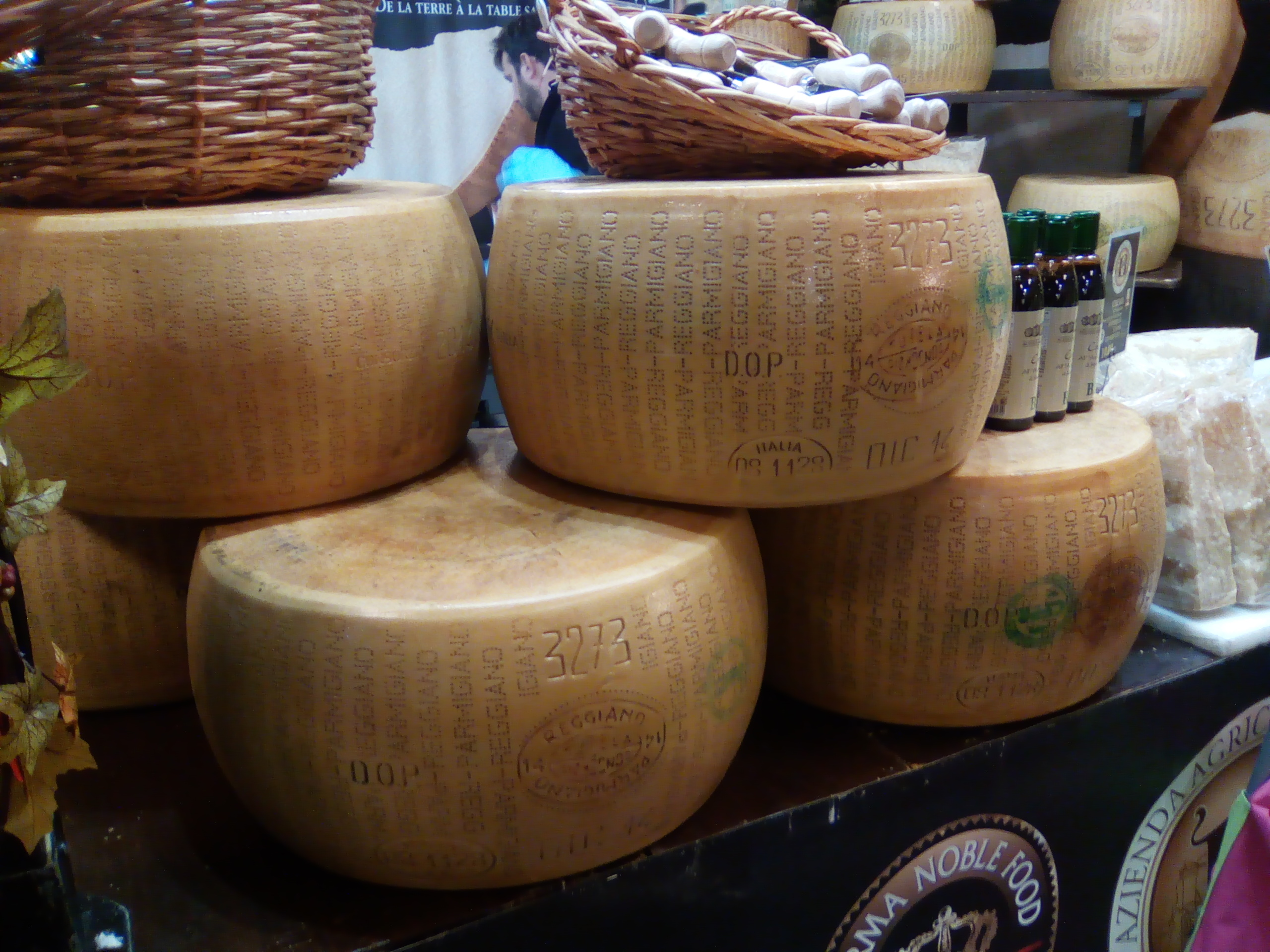
Parmigiano-Reggiano

- Asiago — Asiago, plateau and town in the Venetian Prealps
- Bastardo del Grappa — Monte Grappa in the Venetian Prealps
- Bitto — the Bitto River in Lombardy
- Bra — the town of Bra in Piedmont
- Casciotta d'Urbino — the city of Urbino in the Marche region
- Castelmagno — the municipality of Castelmagno in Piedmont
- Gorgonzola — the town of Gorgonzola near Milan
- Grana Padano — the Po Valley (Pianura Padana)
- Montasio — the mountain Jôf di Montasio in the Julian Alps
- Monte Veronese — the Province of Verona
- Pallone di Gravina — the town of Gravina in Puglia in Apulia
- Parmesan— the city or province of Parma, Emilia-Romagna
- Parmigiano-Reggiano — the cities of Parma and Reggio, Emilia-Romagna
- Pecorino di Filiano — the town of Filiano in the southern region of Basilicata
- Pecorino Romano — the city of Rome
- Pecorino Sardo — the island of Sardinia
- Pecorino Siciliano — the island of Sicily
- Pecorino Toscano — the region of Tuscany
- Piave — the Piave river in the Veneto region
- Quiche florentine — Florence
- Ragusano — the Province of Ragusa on Sicily
- Robiola — possibly named after the town of Robbio in Lombardy
- Romano cheese — American pecorino-style cheese named after Rome
- Rosa Camuna — the Val Camonica in Lombardy
- Taleggio — Val Taleggio in Lombardy
- Valle d'Aosta Fromadzo — the Aosta Valley region
- Valtellina Casera — the Valtellina valley in Lombardy

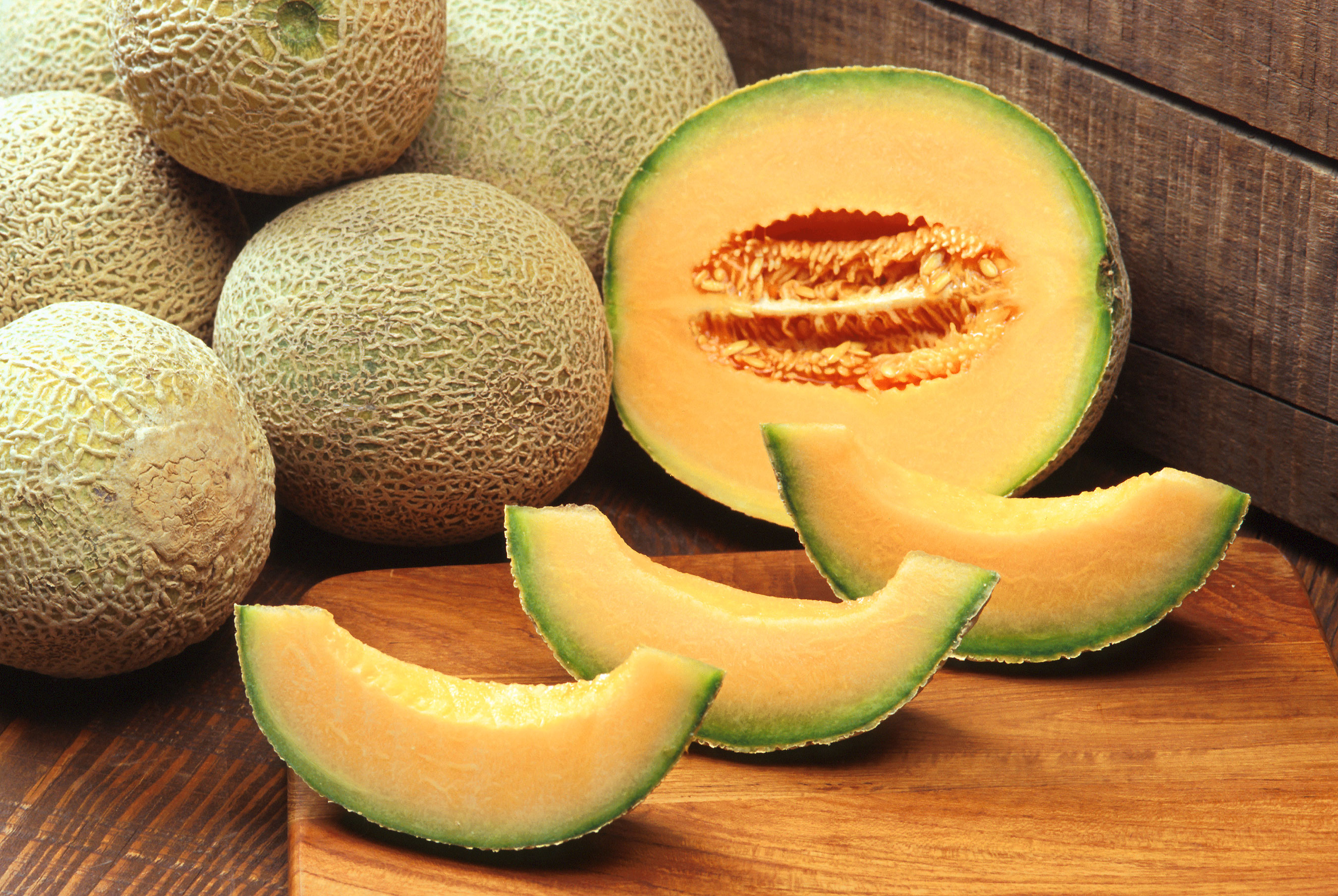
Cantaloupes

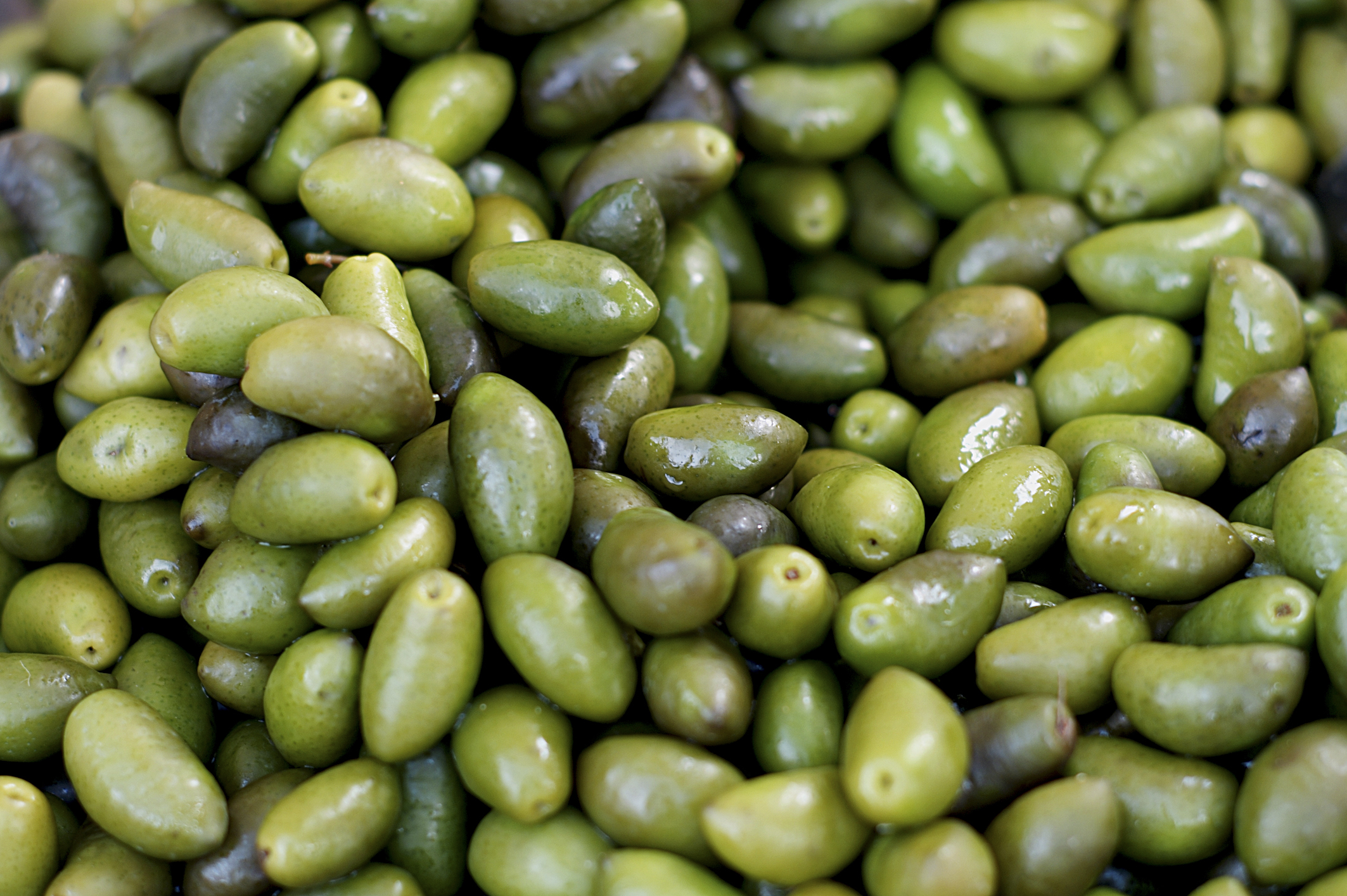
Lucques

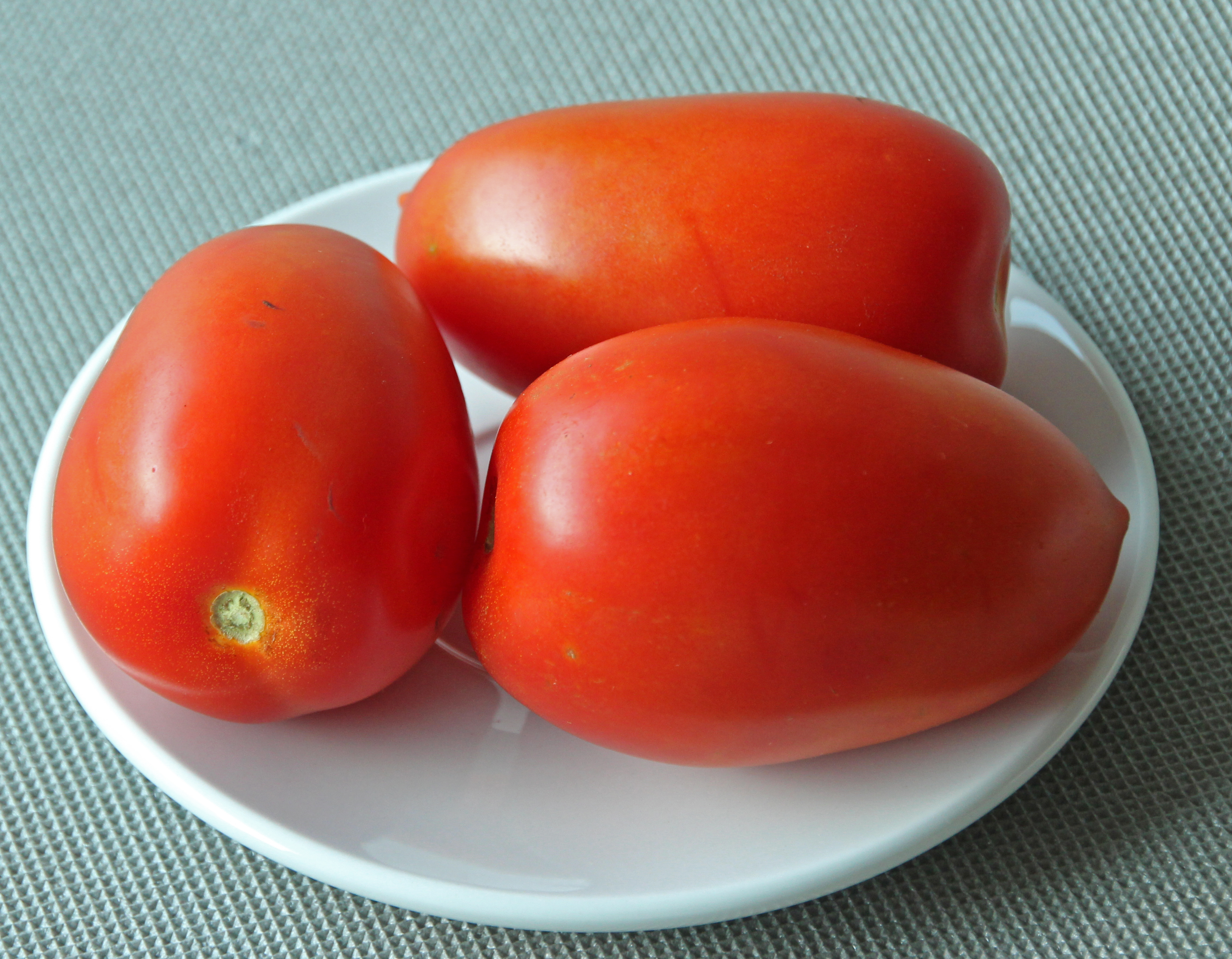
Roma tomatoes

Fruits and vegetables

- Aprutino Pescarese — the Province of Pescara, Abruzzo
- Bosana — the town of Bosa, Sardinia
- Cantaloupe — the town of Cantalupo in Sabina, Lazio
- Caprese salad — the island of Capri, Campania
- Cerignola olive — the town of Cerignola, Apulia
- Florence fennel — the city of Florence, Tuscany
- Florentine citron — Florence
- Giarratana onion — the town of Giarratana, Sicilly
- Italia (grape)
- Italian sweet pepper
- Lucques olive — the city of Lucca, Tuscany
- Mazzarrone (grape) — the town of Mazzarrone, Sicilly
- Nocellara del Belice — the Valle del Belice, Sicily
- Castelvetrano olive — the town of Castelvetrano, Sicily
- Parmigiana — eggplant dish named after the city of Parma
- Pomodorino Vesuviano — tomato named after the Vesuvius volcano
- Pomodoro di Pachino — the town of Pachino, Sicily
- Roma tomato — the city of Rome
- San Marzano tomato — the town of San Marzano sul Sarno, Campania
- Sicilian orange salad — the island of Sicily
- Siracusa lemon — the province of Syracuse, Sicily
- Tuscan pepper — the region of Tuscany

Meat products and dishes

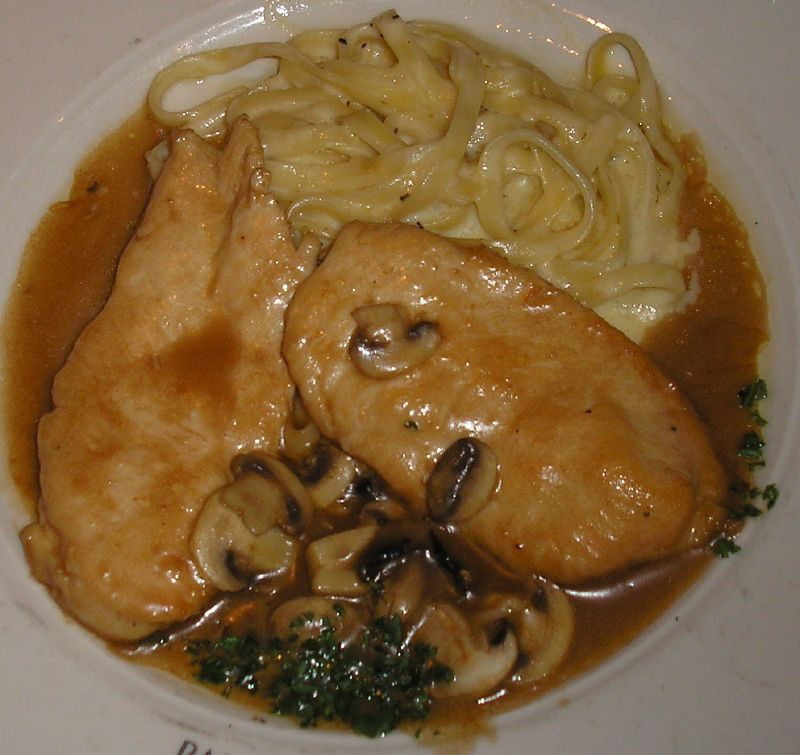
Chicken marsala

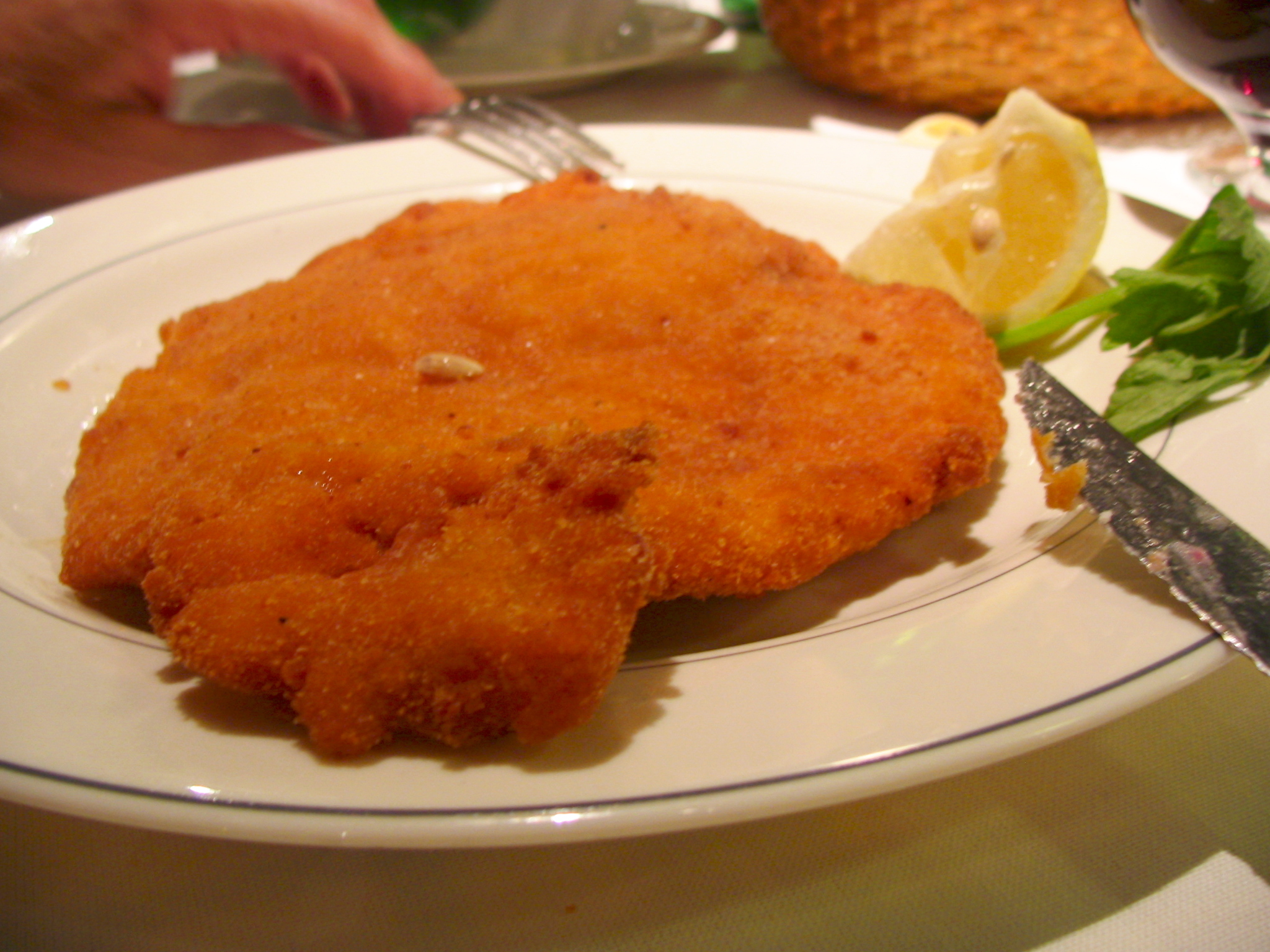
Milanesa

- Bologna sausage — the city of Bologna, Emilia-Romagna
- Chicken Marengo — via the Battle of Marengo — the town of Spinetta Marengo, Piedmont
- Chicken marsala — via Marsala wine — the city of Marsala, Sicily
- Chicken parmigiana — the city or province of Parma
- Chicken Vesuvio — the volcano of Vesuvius
- Cotechino Modena — the city of Modena, Emilia-Romagna
- Florentine steak — the city of Florence, Tuscany
- Genoa salami — the city of Genoa, Liguria
- Italian beef
- Italian hot dog
- Italian sausage
- Likëngë, Loukaniko and Lucanica — sausages named after the ancient area of Lucania in southern Italy
- Milanesa or Cotoletta alla Milanese — meat fillet dish named after the city of Milan
- Parma ham or "Prosciutto di Parma " and Parmo — the city of Parma, Emilia-Romagna
- Paupiettes de Volaille Florentine — a French roulade named after the city of Florence
- Saltimbocca alla Romana — the city of Rome
- Sopressa Vicentina — salami from the city of Vicenza, Veneto
- Spaghetti bolognese — the city of Bologna, Emilia-Romagna
- Speck Alto Adigo — bacon from the province of Alto Adige / South Tyrol

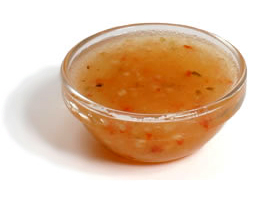
Italian dressing

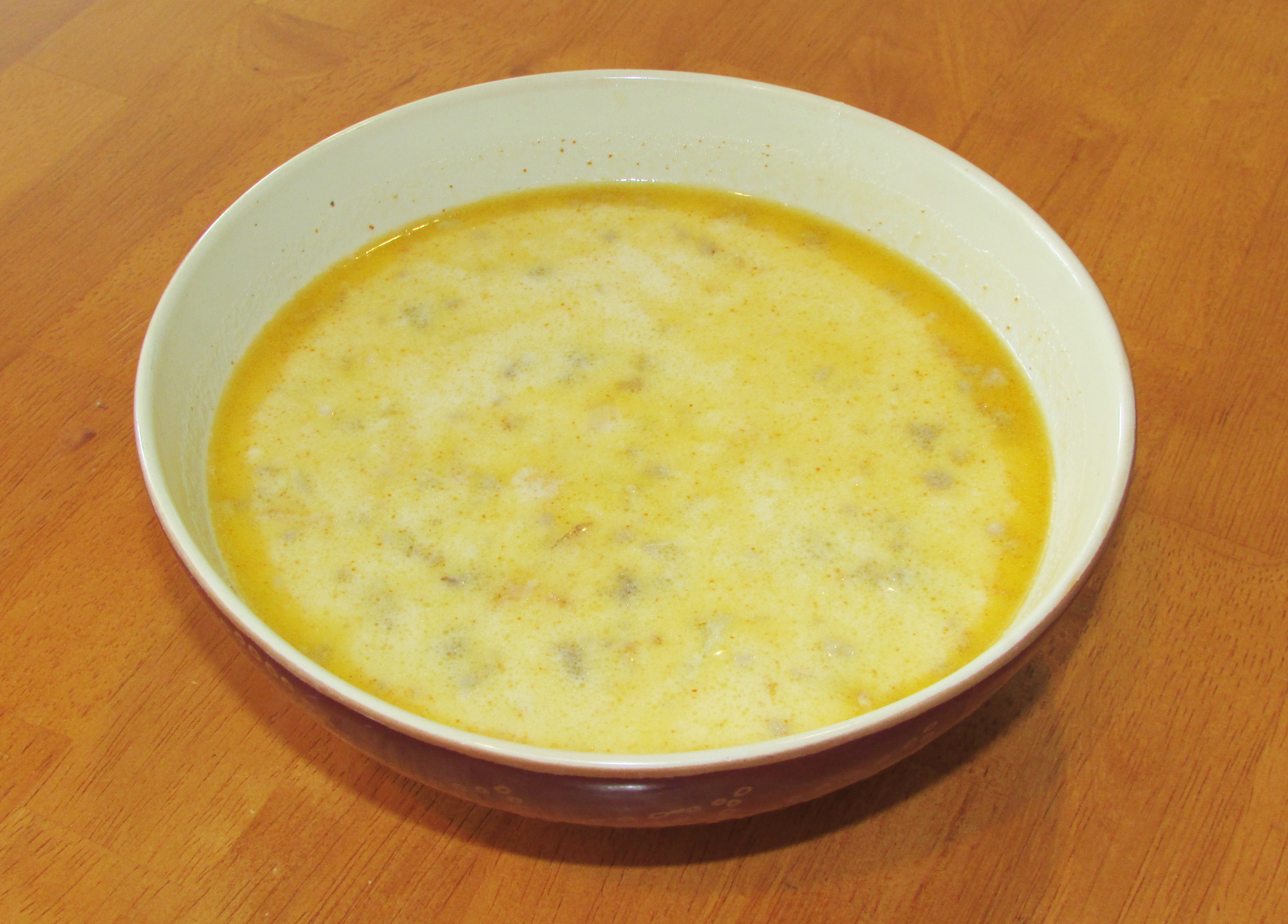
Zuppa toscana

Sauces and dressings

- Amatriciana sauce — the town of Amatrice, Lazio
- Barese ragù — the city of Bari, Apulia
- Bolognese sauce — the city of Bologna, Emilia-Romagna
- Italian dressing
- Neapolitan sauce and Neapolitan ragù — the city of Naples, Campania
- Pesto alla Genovese — the city of Genoa, Liguria
- Venetian sauce — the city of Venice
- Aceto balsamico tradizionale di Modena

Soups

- Buridda alla Genovese — the city of Genoa, Liguria
- Soup alla Canavese — the Canavese region, Piedmont
- Soup alla modenese — the city of Modena, Emilia-Romagna
- Zuppa pavese — the city of Pavia, Lombardy
- Zuppa toscana — the province of Tuscany

==== Portugal ====
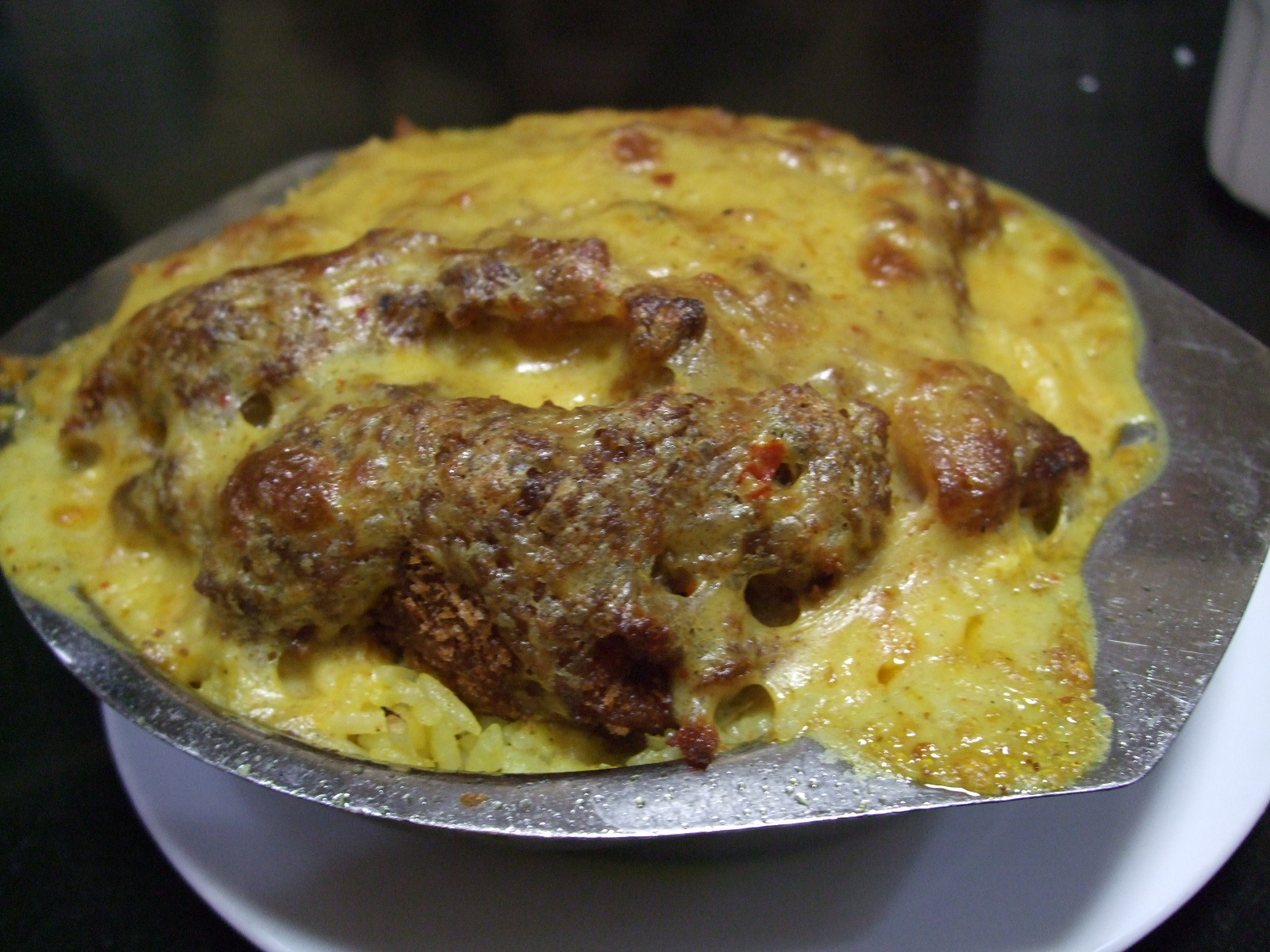
Galinha à Portuguesa

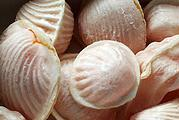
Ovos Moles de Aveiro

- Azaruja sausage — the village of Azaruja, Évora
- Carne de porco à alentejana — pork meat from the Alentejo region
- Castelo Branco cheese — the city or district of Castelo Branco
- Galinha à portuguesa — Macao dish named "Portuguese-style chicken"
- Madeira cake — via Madeira wine after the Portuguese islands of Madeira
- Ovos Moles de Aveiro — sweet from the Aveiro District
- Portuguese asado — roasted fish dish
- Portuguese sauce
- Portuguese sweet bread
- Queijo de Nisa — cheese from the municipality of Nisa, Portalegre
- Queijo do Pico — cheese from Pico Island, one of the Portuguese Azores islands
- Santarém cheese — the Santarém District
- São Jorge cheese — São Jorge Island in the Azores
- Serra da Estrela cheese — the Serra da Estrela mountain range

==== Spain ====
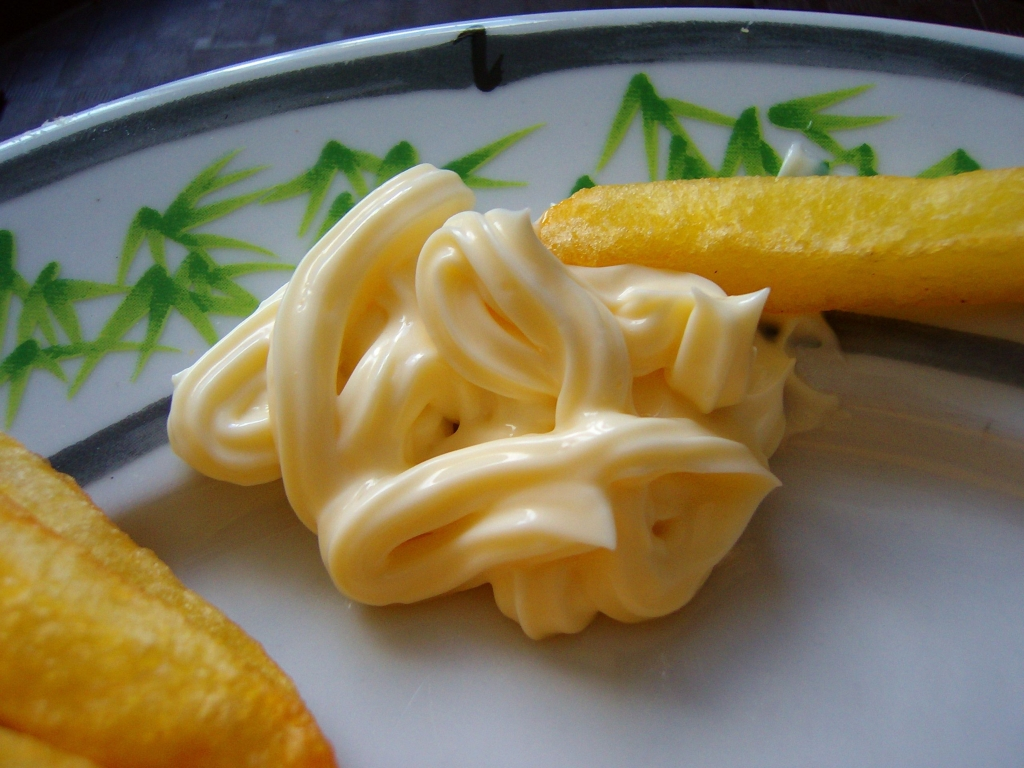
Mayonnaise

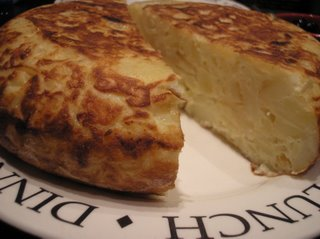
Spanish omelette

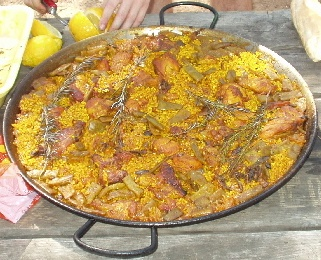
Valencian paella

- Albufera sauce — via the Duke of Albufera after the Albufera lagoon, eastern Spain
- Arroz a la valenciana — Latin American rice dish named after Valencia
- Castella — Japanese cake named after the historical region of Castile
- Chorizo de Pamplona — sausage from the city of Pamplona, Navarre
- Espagnole sauce — Spain
- Lacón Gallego — ham from the region of Galicia
- Mantecadas de Astorga — pastry from the town of Astorga, Léon
- Mató de Pedralbes — pastry from the Pedralbes neighborhood of Barcelona, Spain
- Mayonnaise — perhaps named after the city of Mahón, capital of the island of Menorca
- Morcilla de Burgos — sausage from the city of Burgos, Castile
- Sauce andalouse — Belgian sauce named after the Andalusia region of southern Spain
- Spanische Windtorte — Austrian cake named after Spain
- Spanish omelette
- Spanish rice — the American name for a Mexican side dish
- Tarragona – Swedish chocolate bar named after the city of Tarragona
- Valencian paella — the city, province or region of Valencia
- Valencia rice — Valencia
- Vic fuet — sausage from the town of Vic, Catalonia

Cheeses

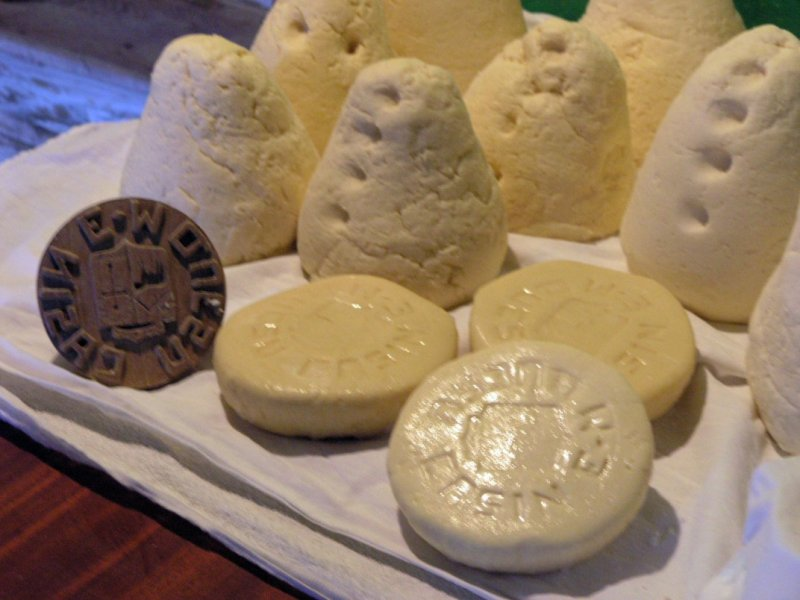
Casín cheese

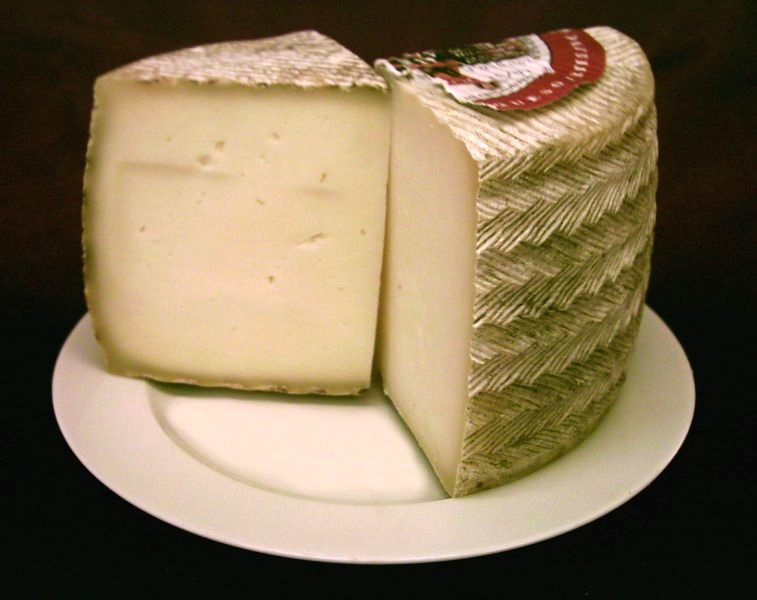
Manchego

- Alpujarra — Alpujarra region, Andalusia
- Cabrales — Cabrales, a municipality in Asturias
- Cantabrian Cream — the autonomous community of Cantabria
- Casín cheese — Caso, a municipality in Asturias
- Flor de Guía — Santa María de Guía, a town in the Canary Islands
- Gamonéu — the small town of Gamonéu in Onís, Asturias
- Garrotxa — Garrotxa county in Catalonia
- Ibores — the Ibor Valley in Extremadura
- Idiazabal — the small town of Idiazabal, Basque Country
- La Serena — the La Serena district in Extremadura
- Mahón — the city of Mahón on the Balearic Islands
- Mallorca — the island of Mallorca
- Manchego — La Mancha region
- Murcian and Murcian wine cheese — the autonomous community of Murcia
- Palmero — the island of La Palma
- Picón Bejes-Tresviso — the small town of Tresviso in Cantabria
- Roncal — the Roncal Valley in Navarre
- Torta del Casar — Casar de Cáceres, a municipality in Extremadura
- Valdeón — Posada de Valdeón, a municipality in Castile and León
- Zamorano — the Province of Zamora

Fruits, nuts and vegetables

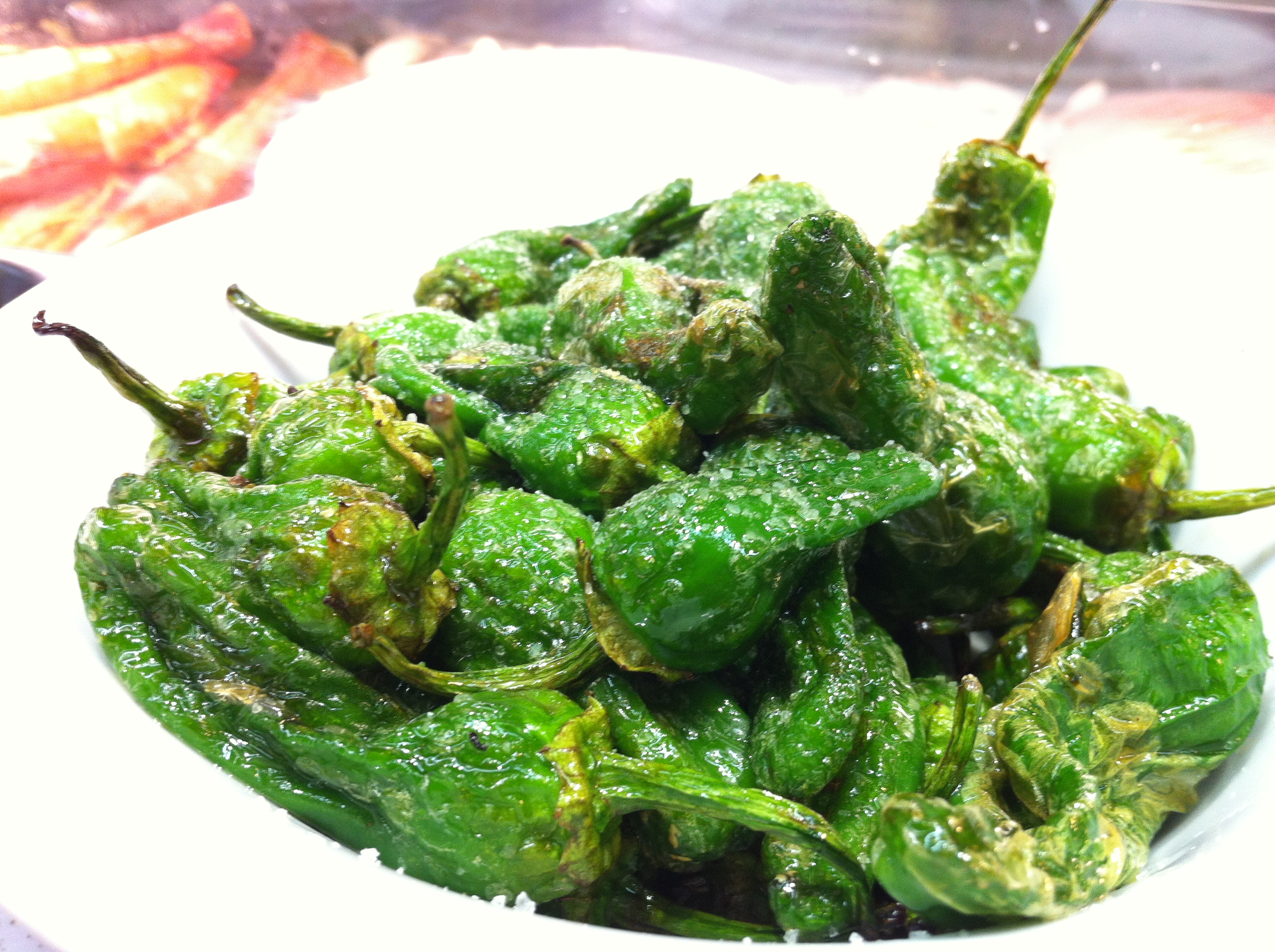
Padron peppers

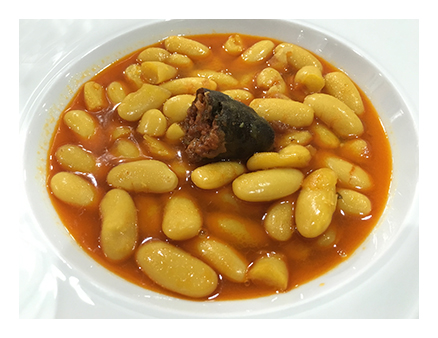
Fabada asturiana

- Alicante tomato — the city or province of Alicante
- Arbequina olive — the village of Arbeca, Catalonia
- Figueres onion — the town of Figueres, Catalonia
- Padrón peppers — the town of Padrón, Galicia
- Seville orange — the city of Seville, Andalusia
- Spanish lime
- Spanish peanut
- Spanish thyme
- Valencia orange — American cultivar named after the city or province of Valencia

Soups and stews

- Caldo gallego ("Galician broth") — the Galicia region
- Minorcan clam chowder — the Balearic Island of Menorca (historically called "Minorca")
- Cocido lebaniego — stew from the region of Liébana, Cantabria
- Cocido madrileño — stew from the city of Madrid
- Fabada asturiana — the province of Asturias
- Pisto manchego — eggplant stew from the La Mancha region
- Porra antequerana — the city of Antequera, Andalusia

=== Western Europe ===
- Éisleker Ham — the Oesling/Éislek region of Luxembourg

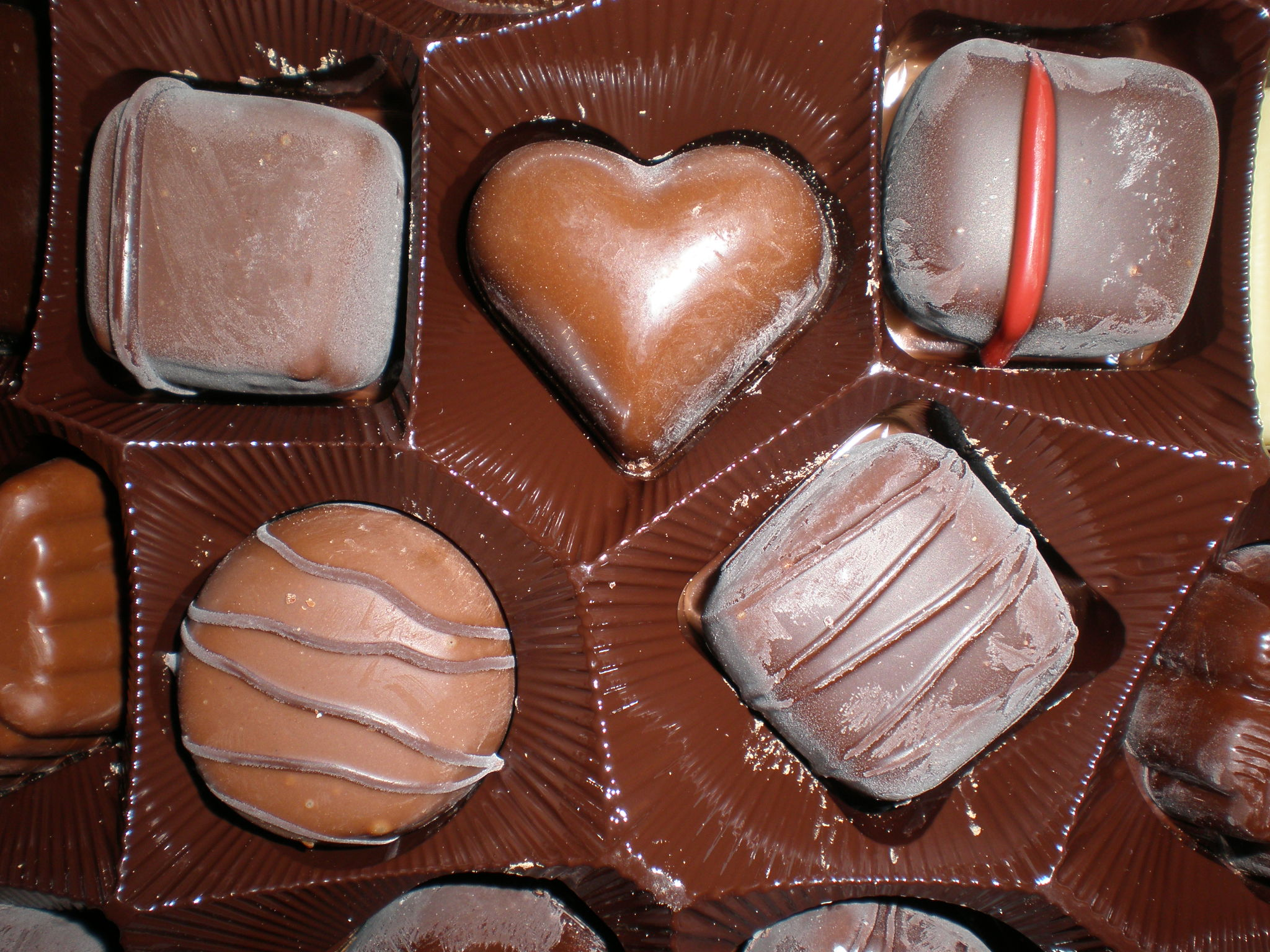
Belgian pralines

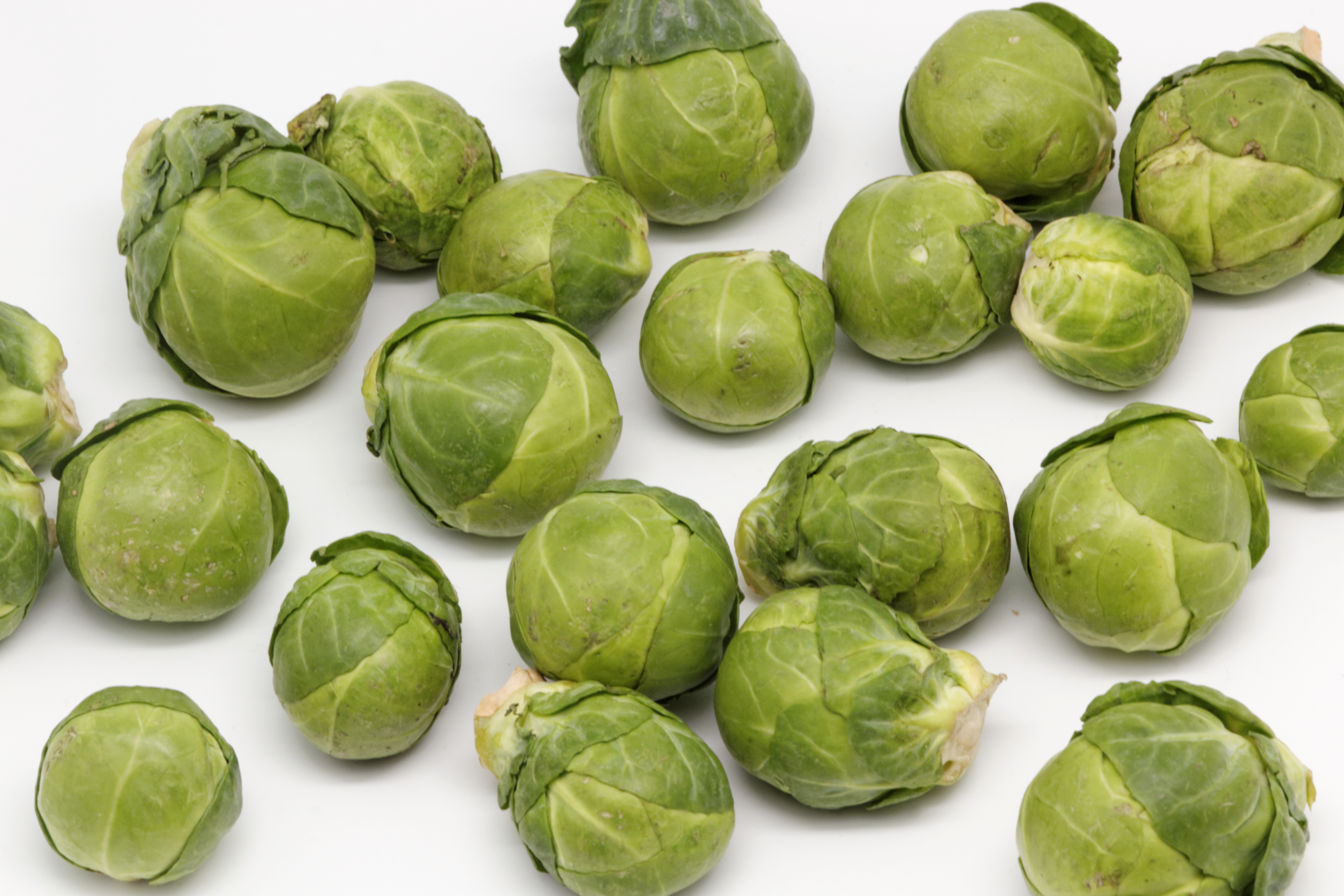
Brussels sprouts

==== Belgium ====
- Belgian biscuit
- Belgian bun
- Belgian endive
- Belgian pralines
- Belgium sausage — Australian product named after Belgium
- Belgian waffle
- Beurre d'Ardenne — butter from the Ardennes region
- Brussels sprouts — the city of Brussels
- Café liégeois — French dessert named after the city of Liège
- Carbonade flamande or Flemish Stew — the County of Flanders
- Couque de Dinant — cookies from the city of Dinant, Namur
- Limburger cheese — the former Duchy of Limburg
- Passendale cheese — the village of Passendale, West Flanders
- Sirop de Liège — fruit spread from the city of Liège
- Waterloo cheese — English cheese named after the town of Waterloo, Brabant

==== France ====
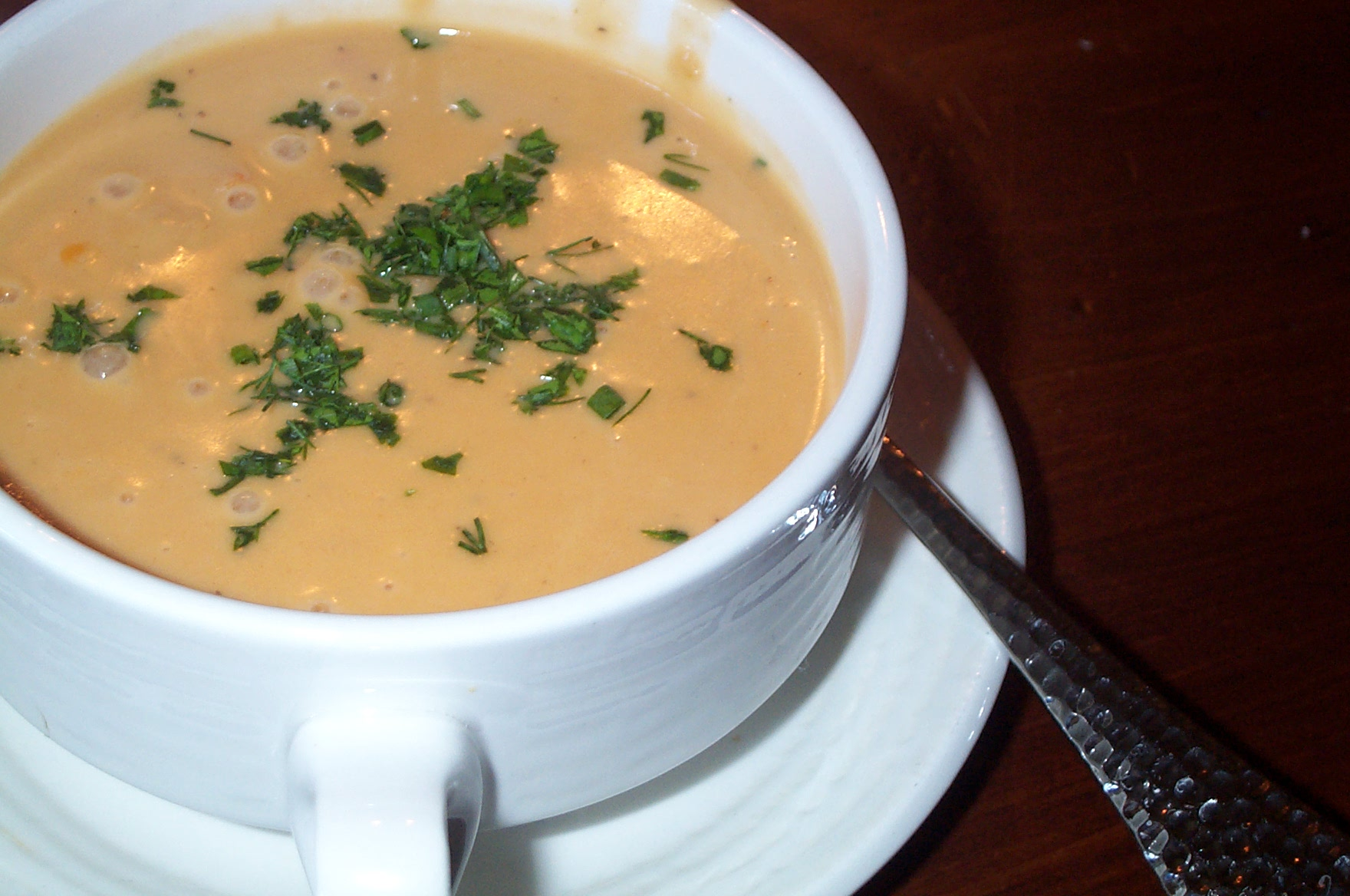
Lobster bisque

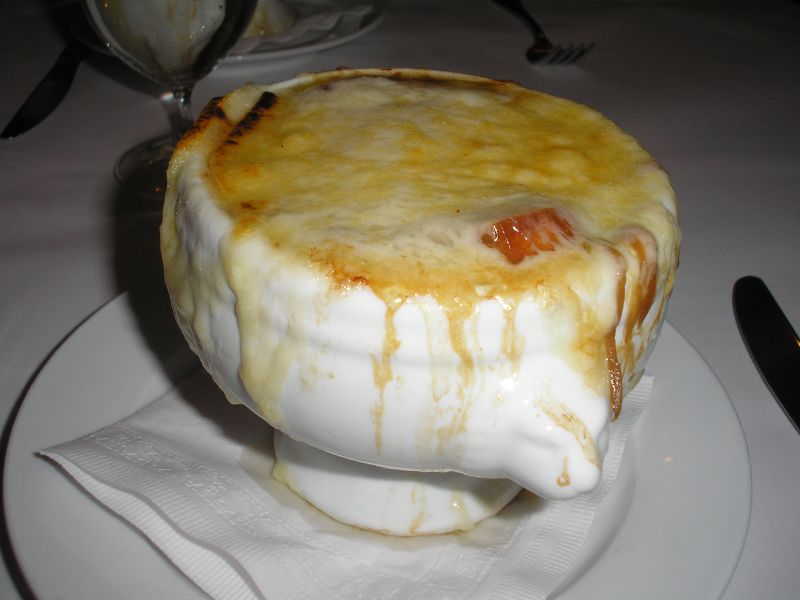
French onion soup

- Belle de Fontenay — potato named after the suburb of Fontenay-sous-Bois, Paris
- Beurre d'Isigny — butter from the town of Isigny-sur-Mer, Normandy
- Bisque — soup named after the Bay of Biscay between Spain and France
- Camargue red rice — the Camargue region, Bouches-du-Rhône
- Crème Chantilly — another term for "whipped cream", after Chantilly, Oise, Hauts-de-France
- French fries is from Belgium.
- French toast
- French onion soup
- French vanilla
- Lyonnaise potatoes — the city of Lyon
- Vichyssoise soup — the city of Vichy, Auvergne

Baked goods

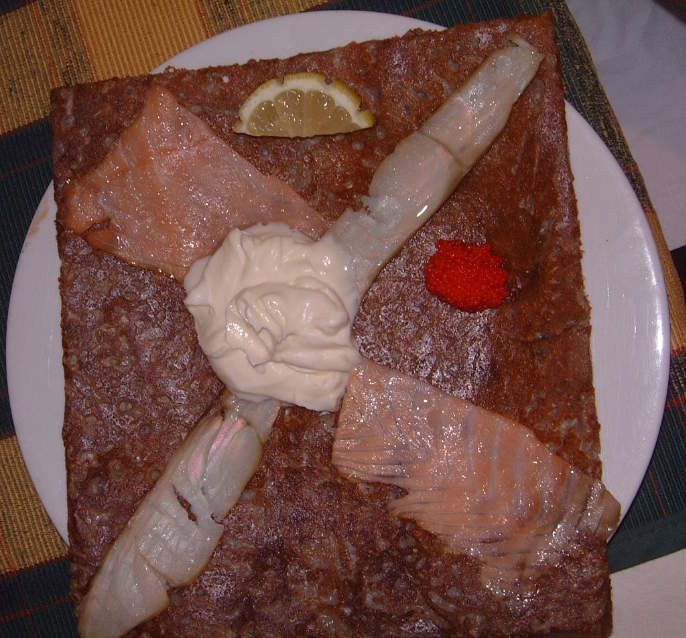
Breton galette

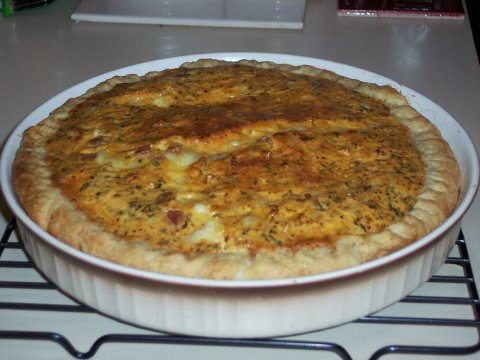
Quiche lorraine

- Biscuit rose de Reims — the city of Reims, Marne, Grand Est
- Bourbon biscuit — British cookie named, via the House of Bourbon — the historic Bourbonnais region
- Breton galette and Crêpe bretonne — the region of Brittany
- Bugnes lyonnaise — the city of Lyon
- Chantilly cake — indirectly after the castle at and village of Chantilly, Oise, Hauts-de-France
- Coussin de Lyon — sweet from the city of Lyon
- Dacquoise — cake named after the town of Dax, Landes
- Far Breton — cake from the region of Brittany
- Ficelle picarde — savory pancake from the region of Picardy
- Franzbrötchen — German pastry named after France
- French toast
- Gâteau Basque — pastry from Basque Country
- Jordan almonds — confectionary perhaps named after the town of Verdun, Meuse
- Nice biscuit or Nizza — a cookie named after the city of Nice, Alpes-Maritimes
- Norman Tart — the Normandy region
- Paris buns — Scottish breadlike cake named after Paris
- Paris–Brest — pastry named for the cities of Paris and Brest, Brittany
- Pithivier — pie named after the town of Pithiviers, Loiret, central France
- Quiche lorraine — the historical region of Lorraine

Cheeses

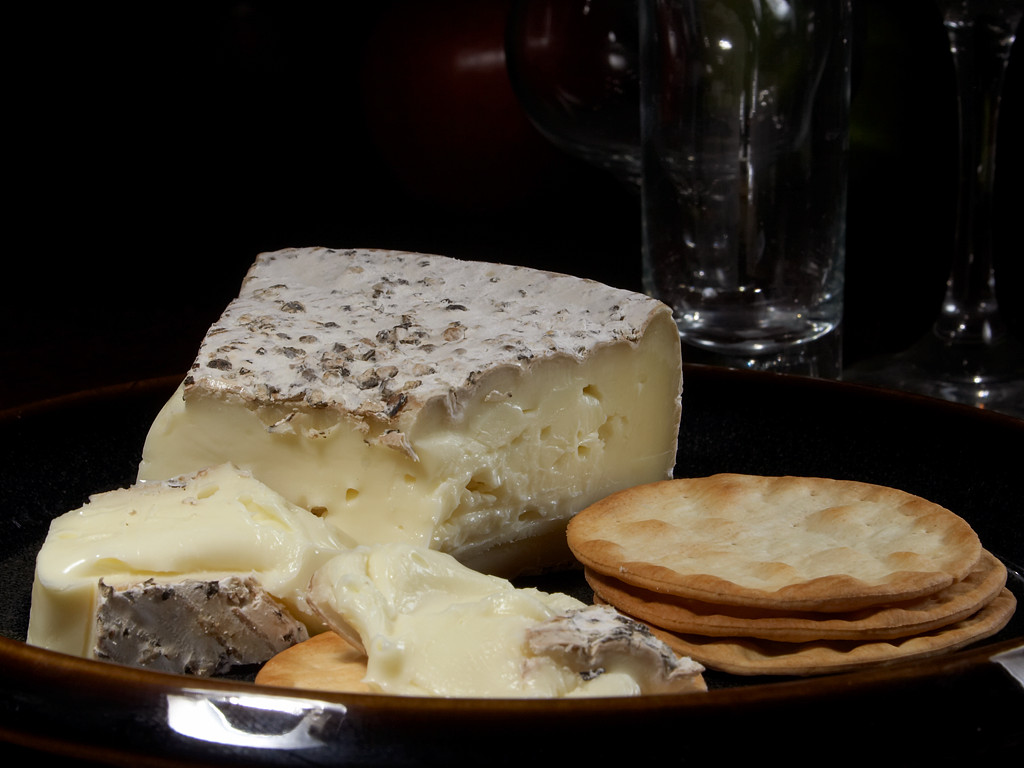
Brie

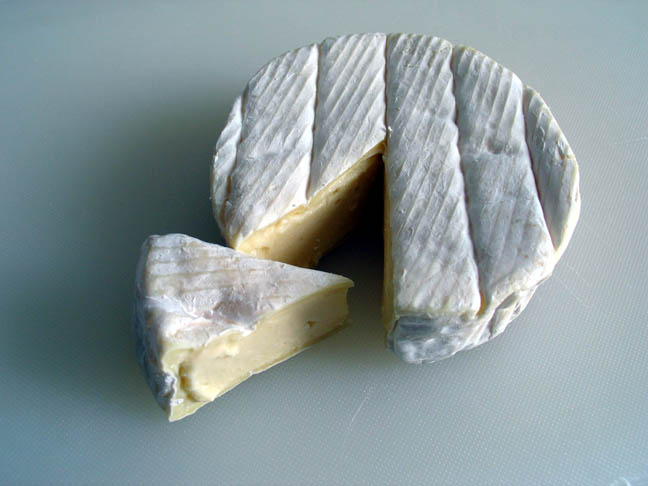
Camembert

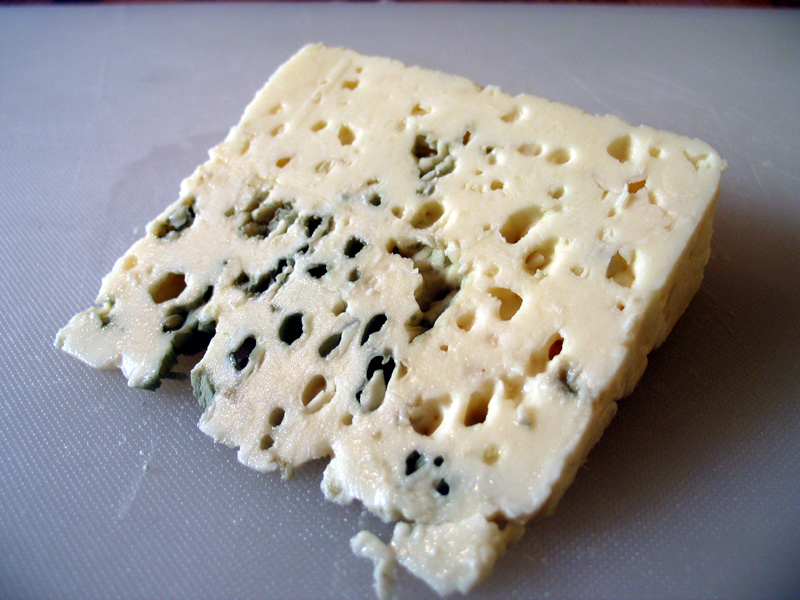
Roquefort

- Abondance — the commune of Abondance, Haute-Savoie
- Banon — the town of Banon in the Provence
- Beaufort — the commune of Beaufort, Savoie
- Bleu d'Auvergne — the central historical province of Auvergne
- Bleu de Gex — the eastern historical Pays de Gex
- Brie — the historical Brie region near Paris
- Camembert — the town of Camembert, Orne, Normandy
- Cantal — the central department of Cantal
- Chaource — the village of Chaource in the Champagne region
- Comté — the eastern Franche-Comté region
- Crottin de Chavignol — the village of Chavignol, France in the central Loire valley
- Époisses — the village of Époisses, Burgundy
- Fourme de Montbrison — Montbriso in the upper Loire valley.
- Laguiole — the village of Laguiole in the southern Aveyron department
- Langres — the Langres plateau in the Champagne region
- Livarot — the town of Livarot in Normandy
- Mâconnais — the city of Mâcon, Saône-et-Loire
- Maroilles — the village of Maroilles near the Belgian border
- Morbier — the village of Morbier near the Swiss border
- Munster — the town of Munster, Haut-Rhin in the Alsace region
- Neufchâtel — the town of Neufchâtel-en-Bray in upper Normandie
- Ossau-iraty — the Ossau Valley and the Irati Forest, French Basque Country
- Pont-l'Évêque — the town of Pont-l'Évêque, Calvados, Normandy
- Pouligny-Saint-Pierre — the commune of Pouligny-Saint-Pierre, Indre
- Rigotte de Condrieu — the town of Condrieu, Rhône
- Rocamadour — the village of Rocamadour in Occitanie

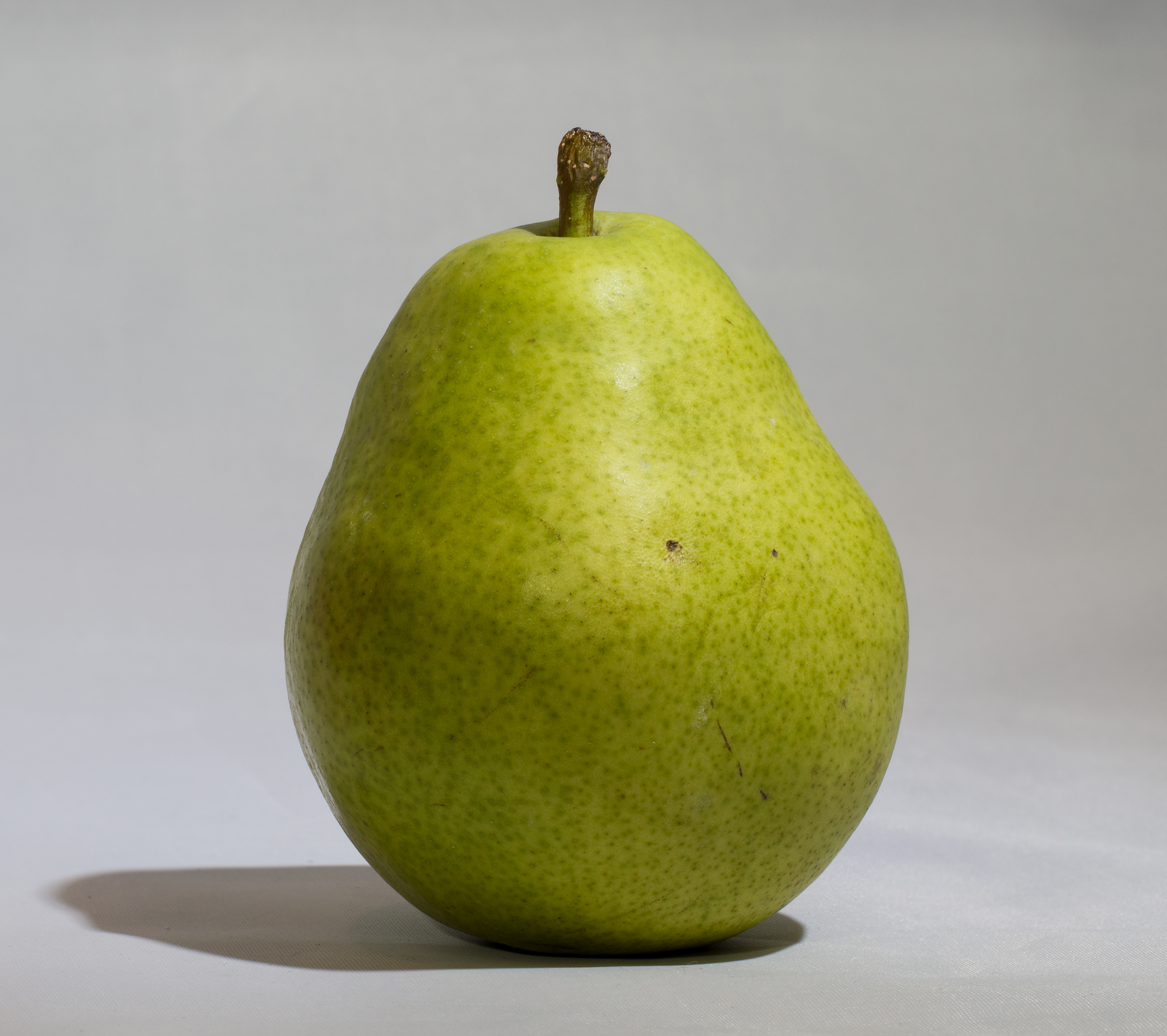
Anjou

- Roquefort — the village of Roquefort-sur-Soulzon in Occitanie
- Sainte-Maure de Touraine — the town of Sainte-Maure-de-Touraine in the Loire valley
- Selles-sur-Cher — the town of Selles-sur-Cher in the Loire valley
- Tomme de Savoie — the historic region of Savoy
- Valençay — the town of Valençay, Indre

Fruits and vegetables

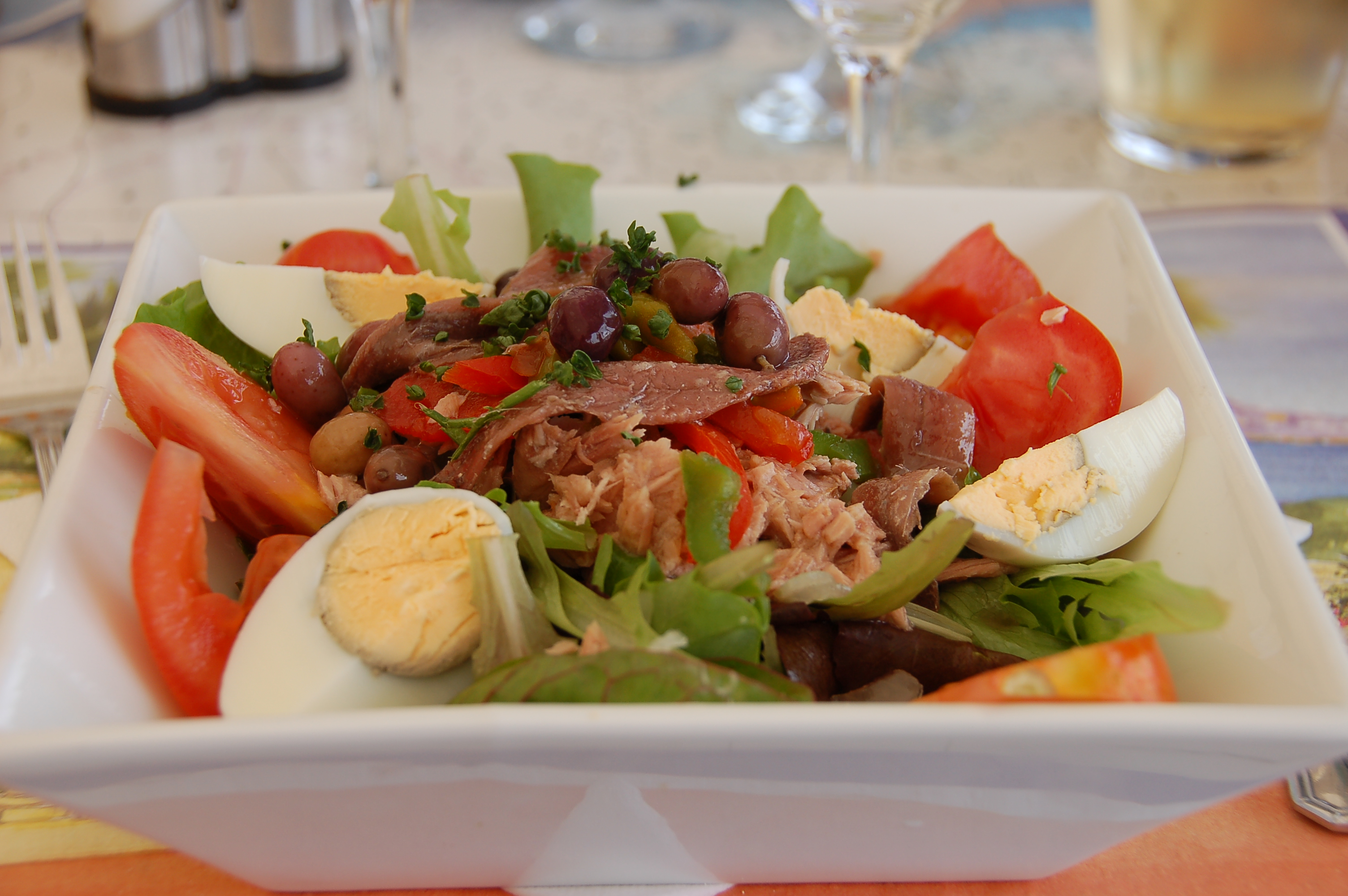
Salade niçoise

- Anjou pear or Beurré d'Anjou — the historical region of Anjou
- Corsican citron — the island of Corsica
- Espelette pepper — the town of Espelette, French Basque Country
- Mirabelle de Lorraine plum — the region of Lorraine
- Montmorency cherry — the town of Montmorency, Val-d'Oise
- Muscat du Ventoux — grape from Mont Ventoux, Provence
- Niçoise (olive), Olive de Nice and Salade niçoise — the city of Nice
- Poire à la Beaujolaise — pear recipe named after the historical province of Beaujolais
- Salonenque olive — the town of Salon-de-Provence, Bouches-du-Rhône
- Nyons olive — the town of Nyons, Drôme

Meat products and dishes

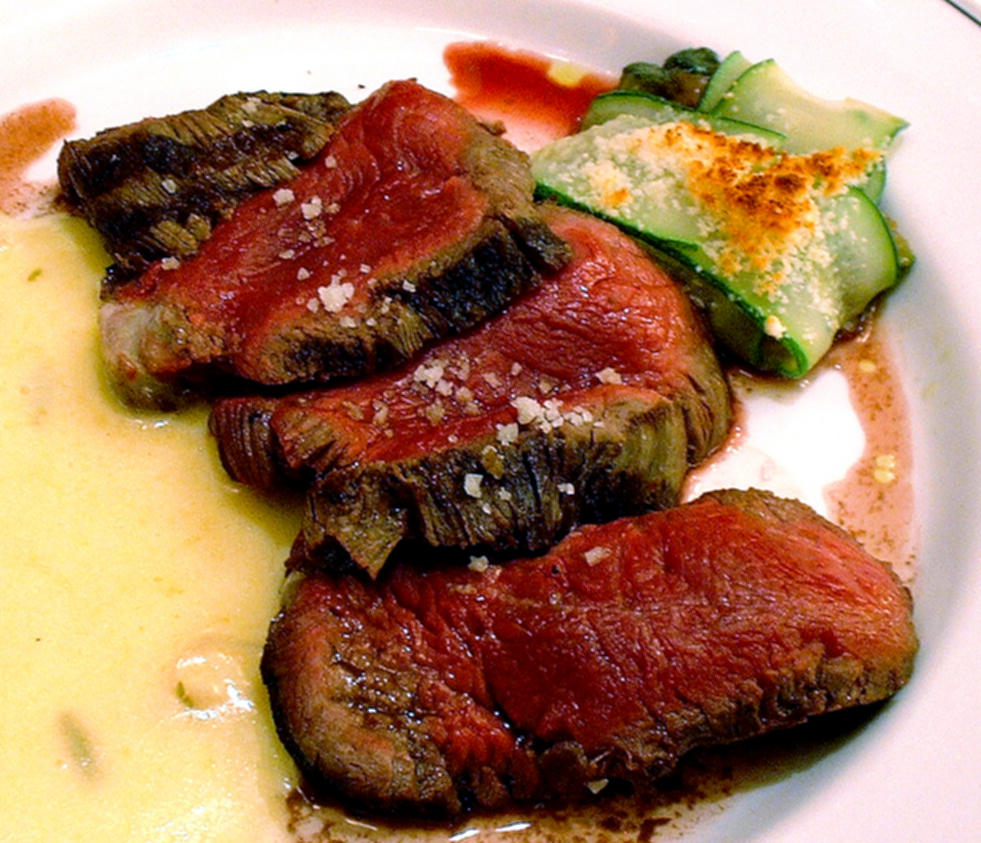
Chateaubriand with Béarnaise sauce

- Bayonne ham — the city of Bayonne, French Basque Country
- Beef bourguignon — the Burgundy (Bourgogne) region
- Boudin blanc de Rethel — the town of Rethel, Champagne
- Cervelas de Lyon — the city of Lyon
- Chateaubriand steak — probably after the town of Châteaubriant, Loire-Atlantique
- Lyoner sausage — Lyon
- Morteau sausage — the town of Morteau, Franche-Comté
- Pariser Schnitzel — the city of Paris
- Rosette de Lyon and Saucisson de Lyon — Lyon
- Saucisse de Toulouse — the city of Toulouse, Occitanie

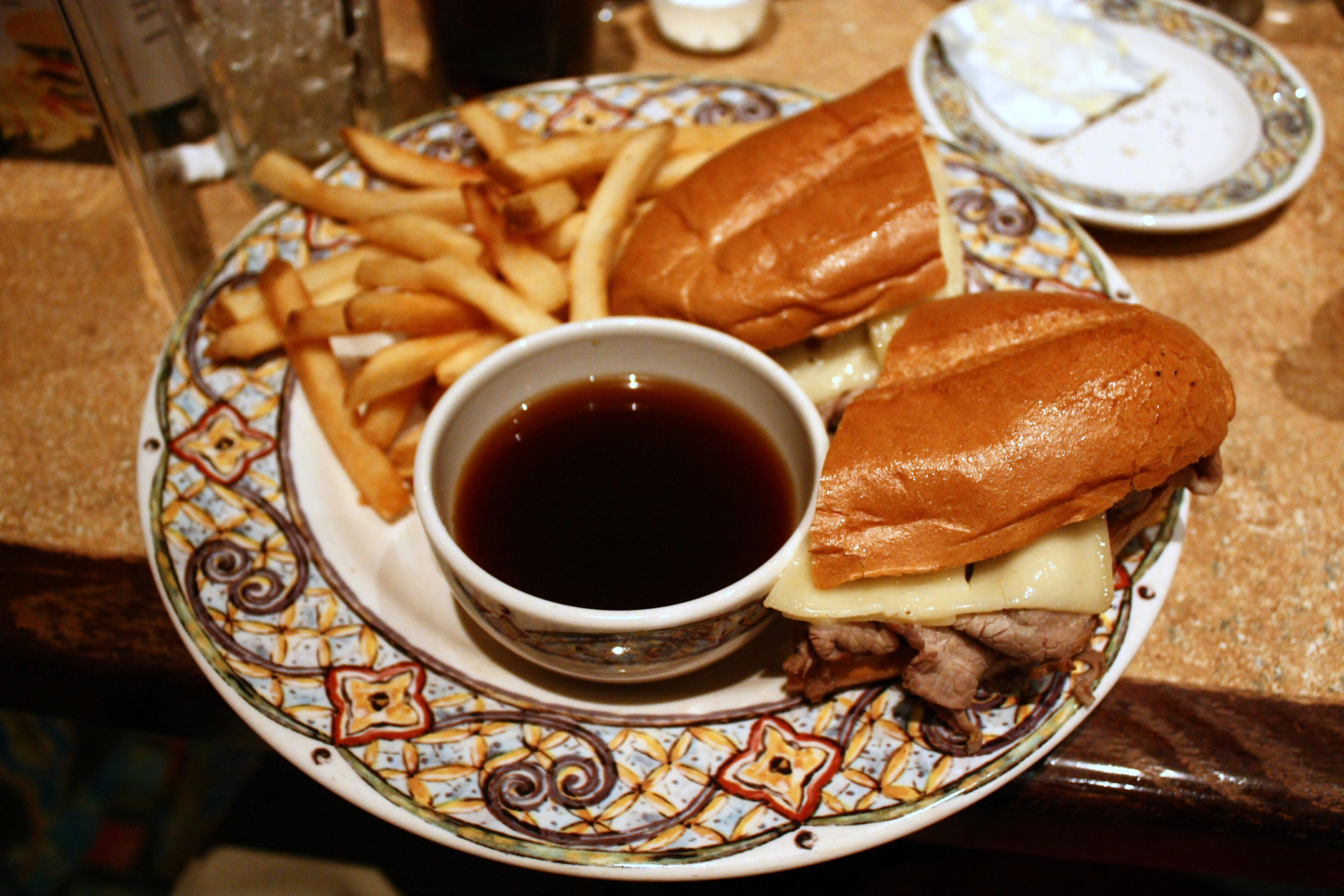
French dip

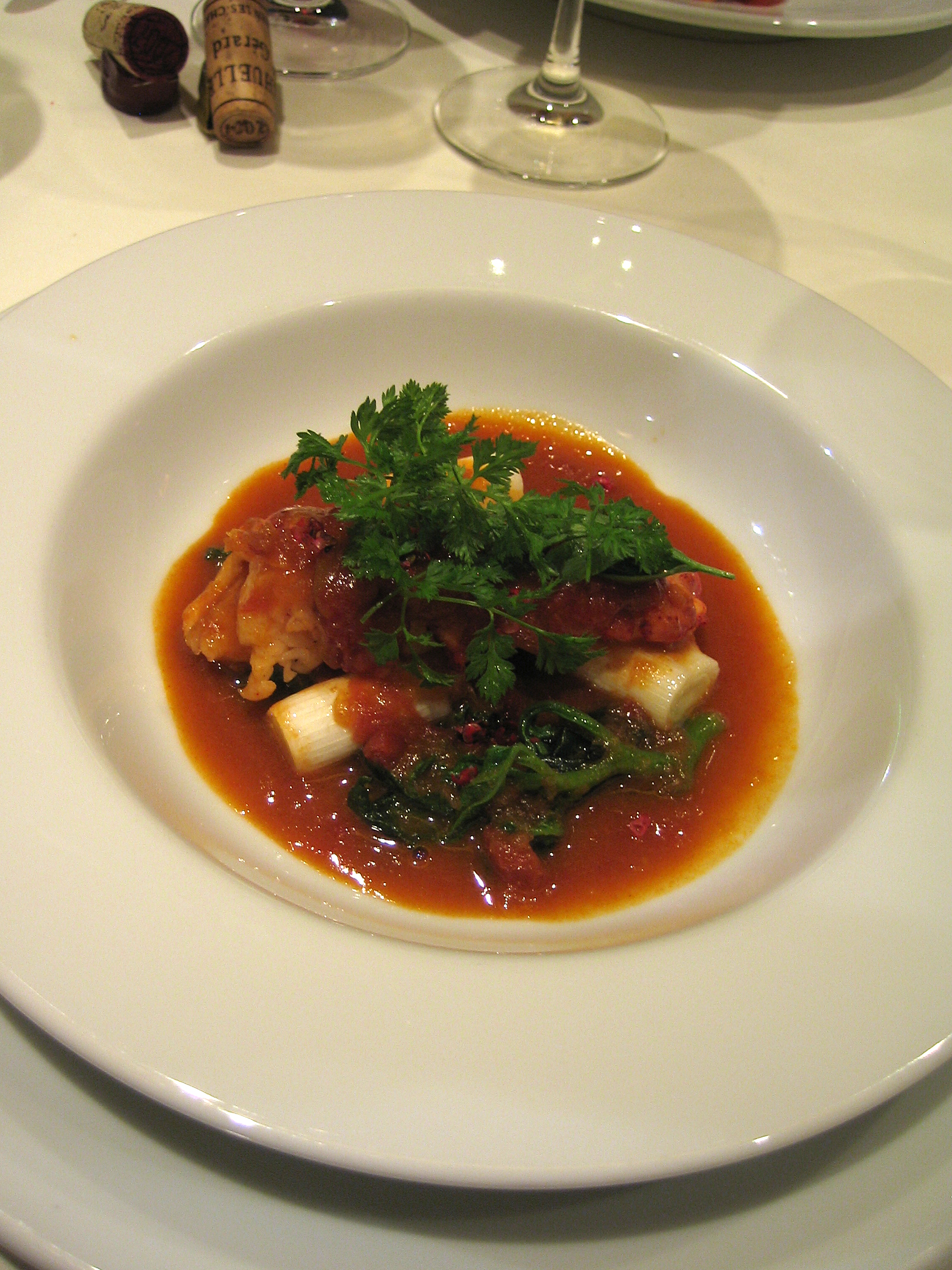
Lobster with sauce américaine

Sauces, dressings and condiments

- Sauce Américaine — the ancient region of Armorica
- Béarnaise sauce — the province of Béarn, Pyrénées-Atlantiques
- Bordelaise sauce — the city of Bordeaux, Gironde
- Breton sauce — the region of Brittany
- Café de Paris sauce — Paris
- Dijon mustard — the city of Dijon, Burgundy
- French dip and French onion dip
- French dressing
- Honey Dijon dressing — the city of Dijon
- Nantua sauce — the village of Nantua, Ain
- Normande sauce — the Normandy region
- Rouennaise sauce — the city of Rouen, Normandy
- Sauce Américaine, originally Sauce armoricaine — Armorica, an ancient region of northwest France
- Sauce bourguignonne — the Burgundy (Bourgogne) region
- Sauce lyonnaise — the city of Lyon
- Sauce parisienne — Paris

==== Ireland ====
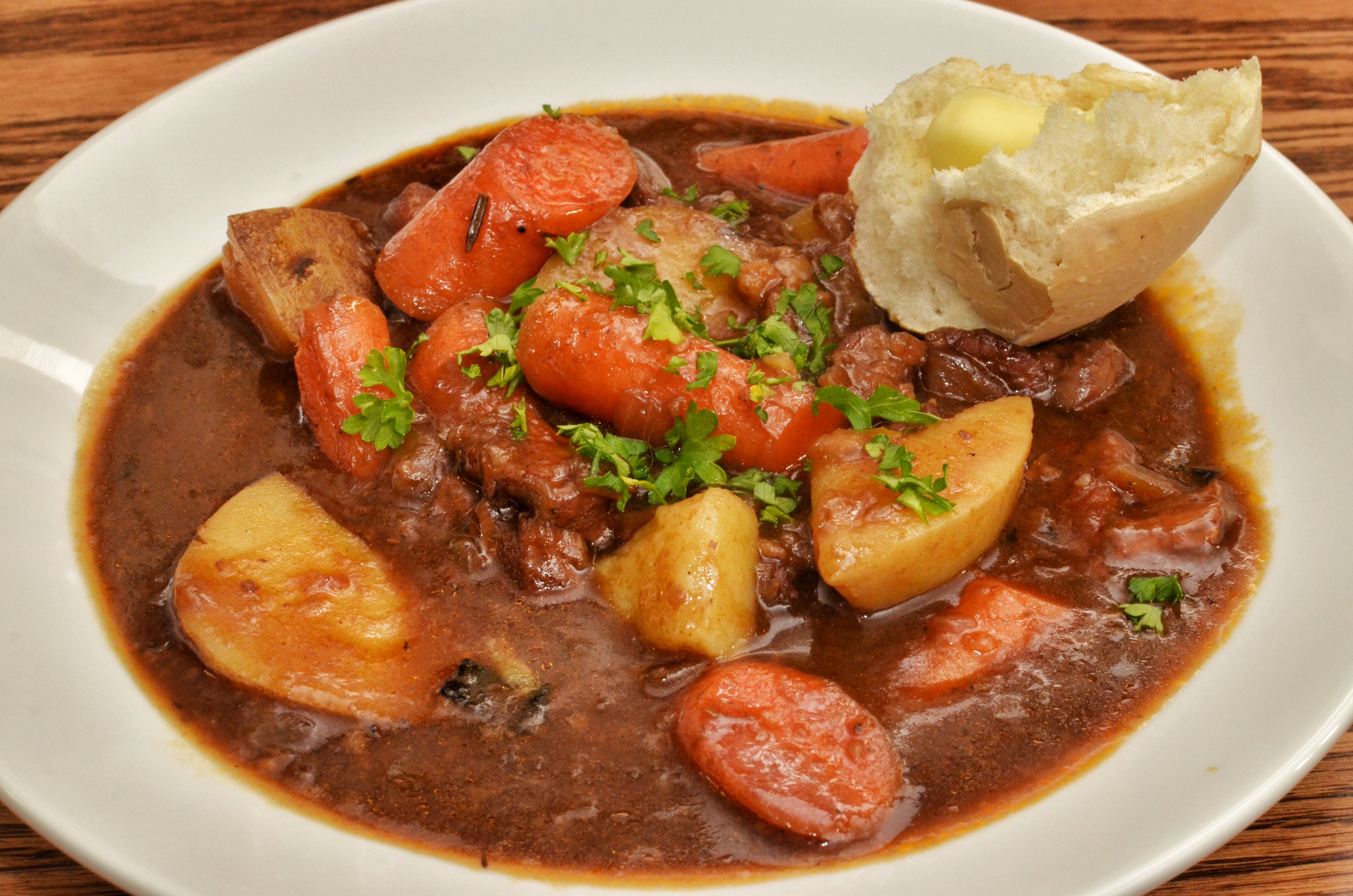
Irish stew

- Dublin Bay prawn — the city of Dublin
- Dubliner cheese — Dublin
- Irish breakfast
  - Full Irish breakfast roll
- Irish Lumper and Irish White potatoes
- Irish soda bread
- Irish stew — Ireland
- Limerick ham — County Limerick
- Ulster Emblem — potato from the historic province of Ulster
- Ulster fry — breakfast from Ulster
- Waterford Blaa — a doughy, white bread bun (roll) speciality particularly associated with Waterford, Ireland

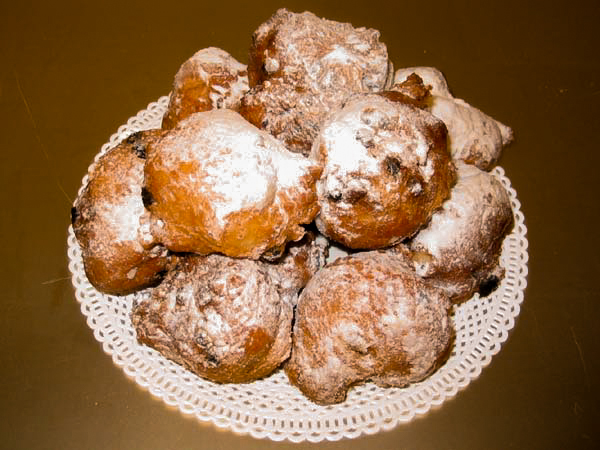
Dutch dougnuts or Dutchies

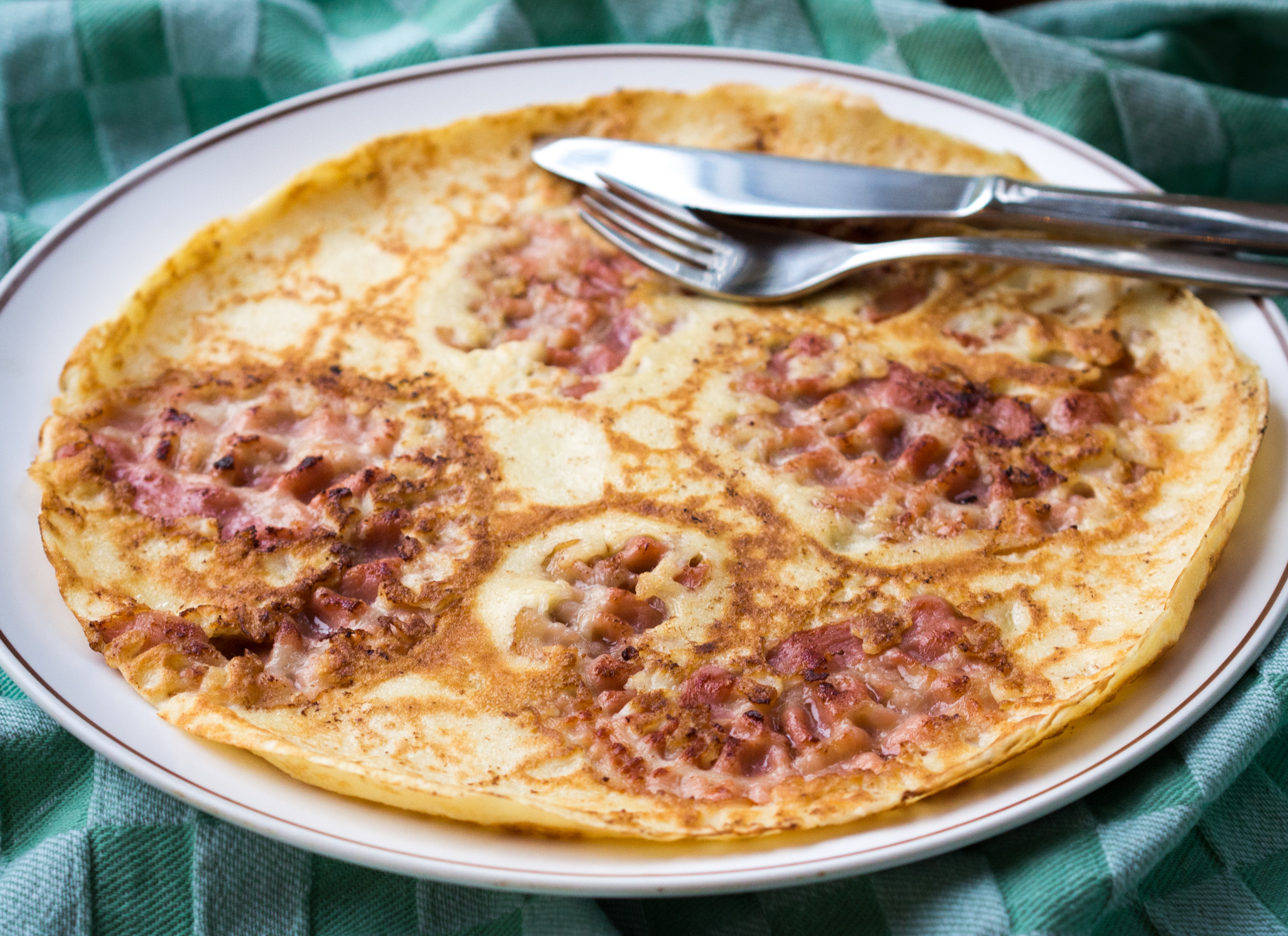
Dutch pancake

==== Netherlands ====
- Belle de Boskoop apple — the town of Boskoop, South Holland
- Boskoop Glory grape — the town of Boskoop
- Bossche bol — pastry from the city of Den Bosch, North Brabant
- Dutch apple pie
- Dutch biscuits
- Dutch carnival cake
- Dutch crunch bread
- Dutch doughnut and Dutchie (doughnut)
- Dutch letter — almond pastry
- Dutch licorice
- Dutch loaf — luncheon meat
- Dutch pancake
- Dutch process chocolate
- Dutch waffle
- Elstar apple — the city of Elst, Gelderland
- Hollandaise sauce — the Holland region
- Zeeuws spek — bacon dish from the province of Zeeland
- Zeeuwse bolus — pastry from Zeeland

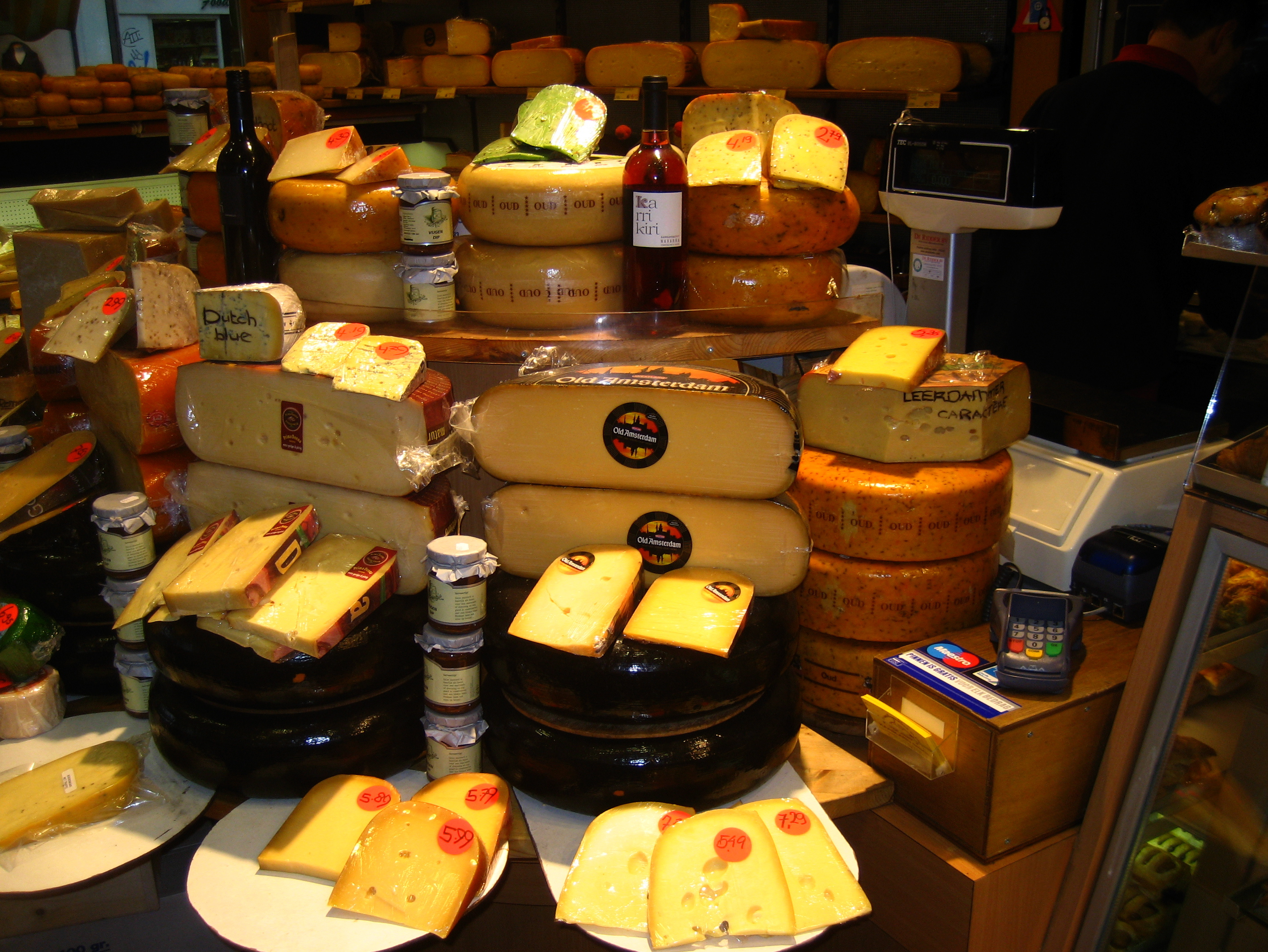
Gouda, Old Amsterdam, Leerdammer, and other Dutch cheeses

Cheeses

- Beemster — the Beemster polder, North Holland
- Edam — the city of Edam, North Holland
- Friesian Clove — the province of Friesland
- Gouda — the city of Gouda, South Holland
- Leerdammer — the city of Leerdam, South Holland
- Leyden — the city of Leiden, South Holland
- Maasdam — the village of Maasdam, South Holland
- Old Amsterdam — brand of Gouda cheese named after the city of Amsterdam

==== United Kingdom ====
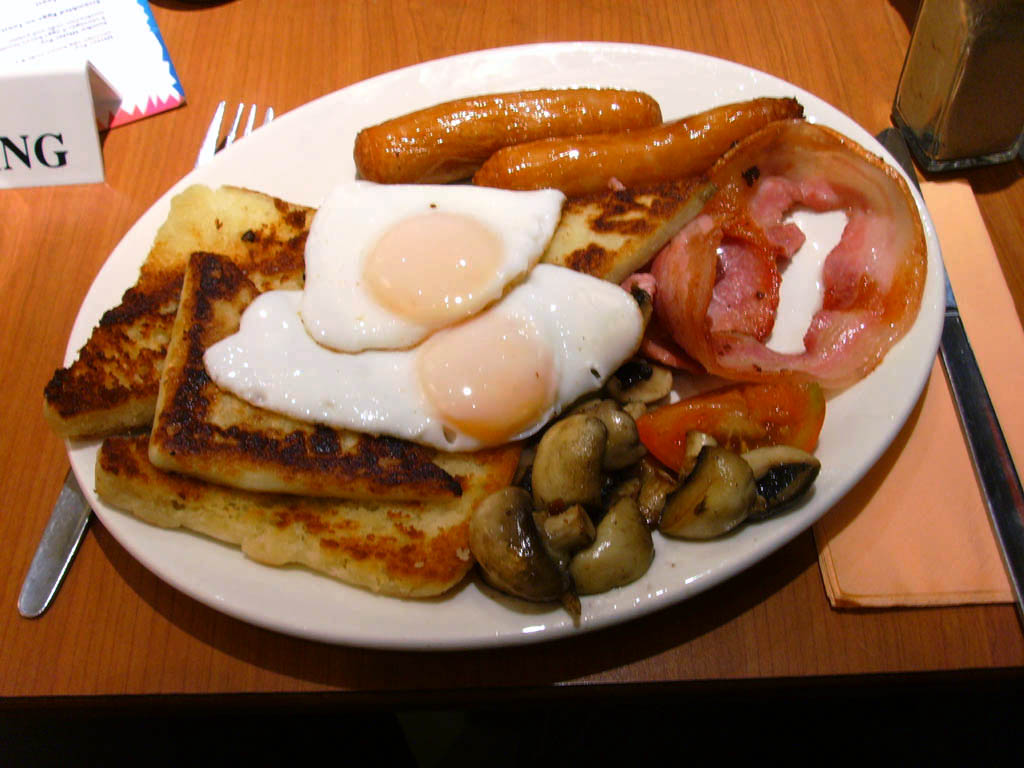
Ulster fry

- Coleraine Cheddar — the town of Coleraine, Northern Ireland
- Guernsey Bean Jar — bean stew from the island of Guernsey
- Guernsey Gâche — raisin bread from Guernsey
- Jersey Royal potato — the island of Jersey
- Manks Codlin — apple from the Isle of Man
- Manx Queenie — scallop harvested around the Isle of Man
- Ulster Emblem — potato from the historic Irish province of Ulster
- Ulster fry — breakfast from Ulster

===== England =====
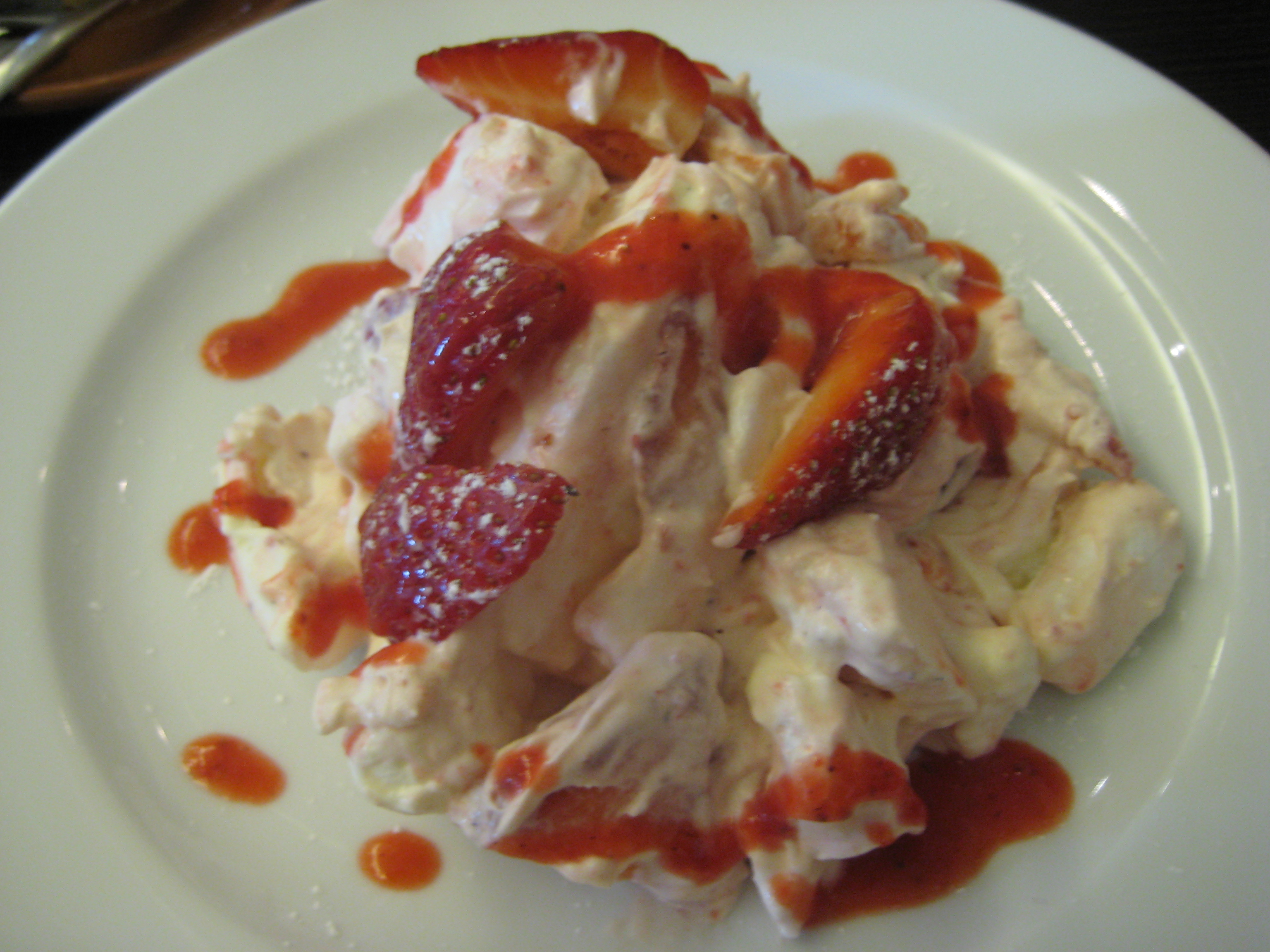
Eton mess

- Brown Windsor soup — perhaps via the Windsor bean after the town of Windsor, Berkshire
- Cornish clotted cream and Cornish ice cream — the county of Cornwall
- Cornish sardines — the county of Cornwall
- Dover sole — the town of Dover, Kent
- English breakfast
- Eton mess — the town of Eton, Berkshire
- Everton mint — candy from the Everton suburb of Liverpool
- Grimsby smoked fish — the town of Grimsby, Lincolnshire
- Kendal Mint Cake — peppermint candy from the town of Kendal, Cumbria
- Kentish well pudding — the county of Kent
- Malvern pudding — the town of Malvern, Worcestershire
- Pontefract cake — licorice candy from the town of Pontefract, Yorkshire
- Sussex pond pudding — Sussex county

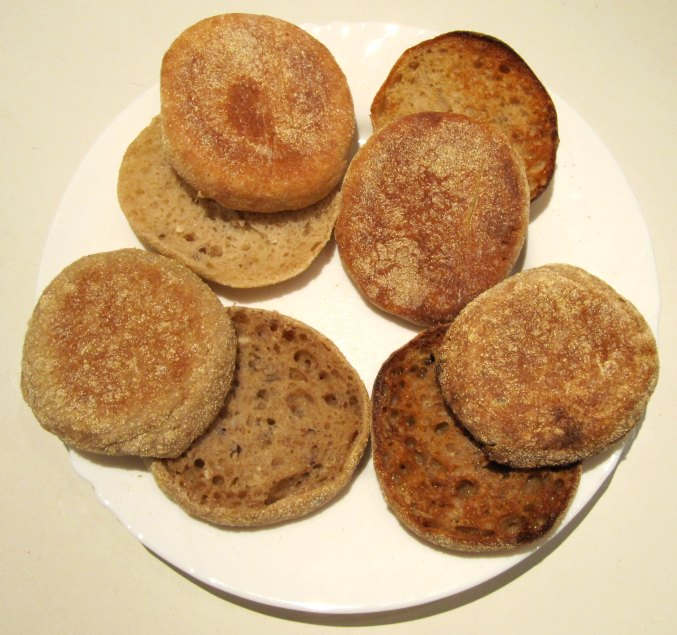
English muffins

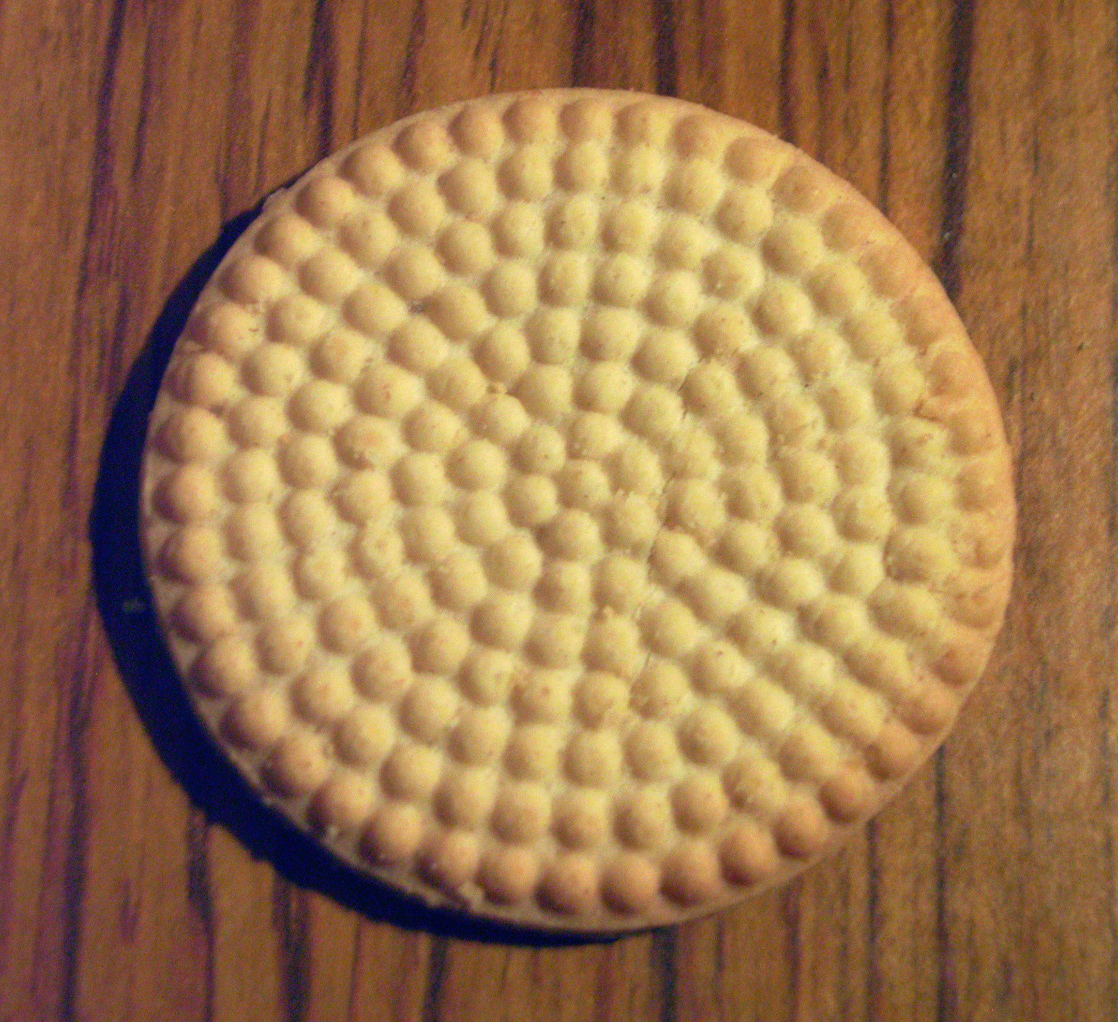
Lincoln biscuit

Baked goods

- Bakewell pudding and Bakewell tart — the town of Bakewell, Derbyshire
- Banbury cake — the town of Banbury, Oxfordshire
- Bath bun and Bath Oliver cracker — the city of Bath, Somerset
- Bedfordshire clanger — the county of Bedfordshire
- Chelsea bun — the Chelsea area of London
- Chorley cake — the town of Chorley, Lancashire
- Cornish fairings and Cornish pasty — the county of Cornwall
- Cumberland pie — the historic county of Cumberland
- Dorset apple cake — Dorset county
- Dorset knob — flatbread from Dorset county
- Eccles cake — the town of Eccles, Greater Manchester
- English muffin
- Lincoln biscuit — the city of Lincoln, Lincolnshire
- London bun — the city of London
- Manchester tart — the city of Manchester
- Sandwich — via the 4th Earl of Sandwich after the village of Sandwich, Kent
- Shrewsbury cake or biscuit — the town of Shrewsbury, Shropshire
- Staffordshire oatcake — Staffordshire county
- Tottenham cake — the Tottenham area of northern London
- Yorkshire pudding — Yorkshire county

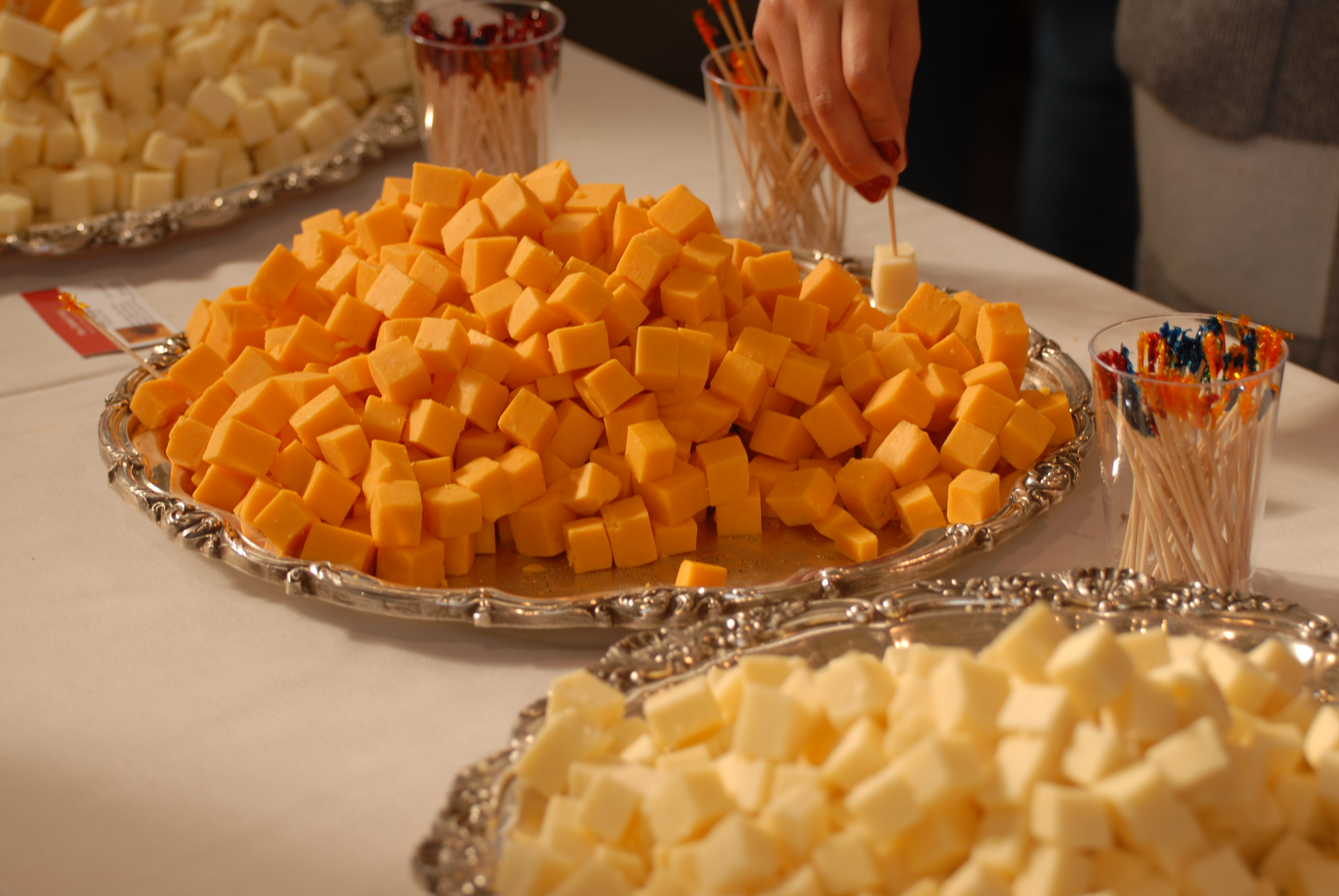
Cheddar

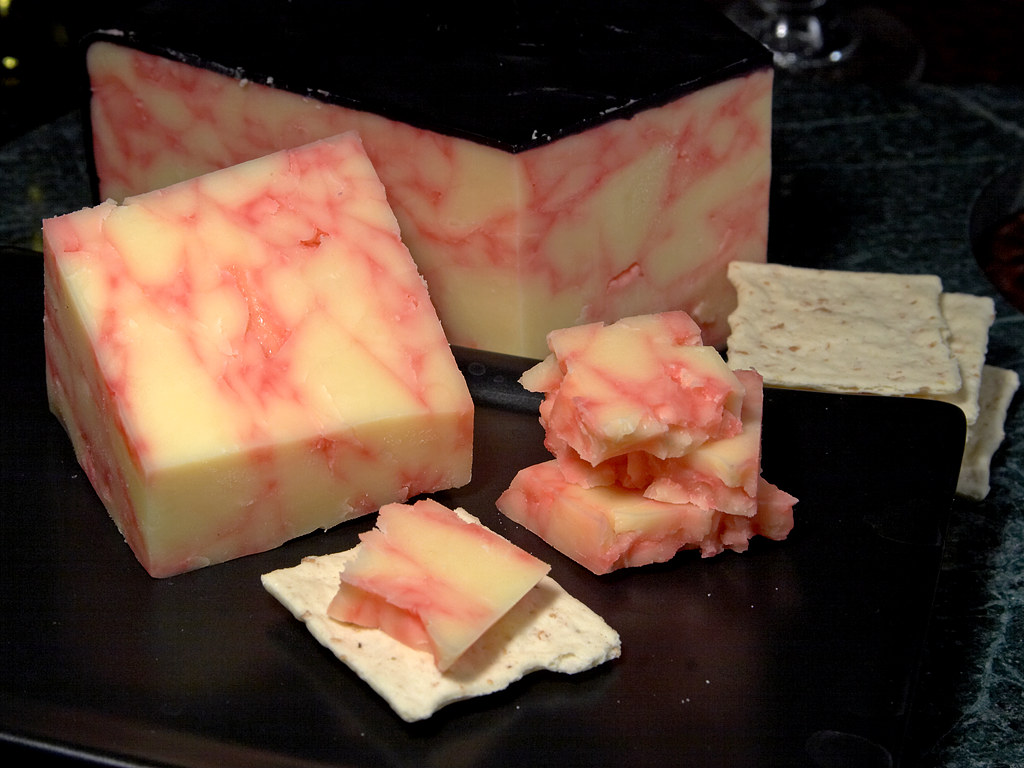
Red Windsor

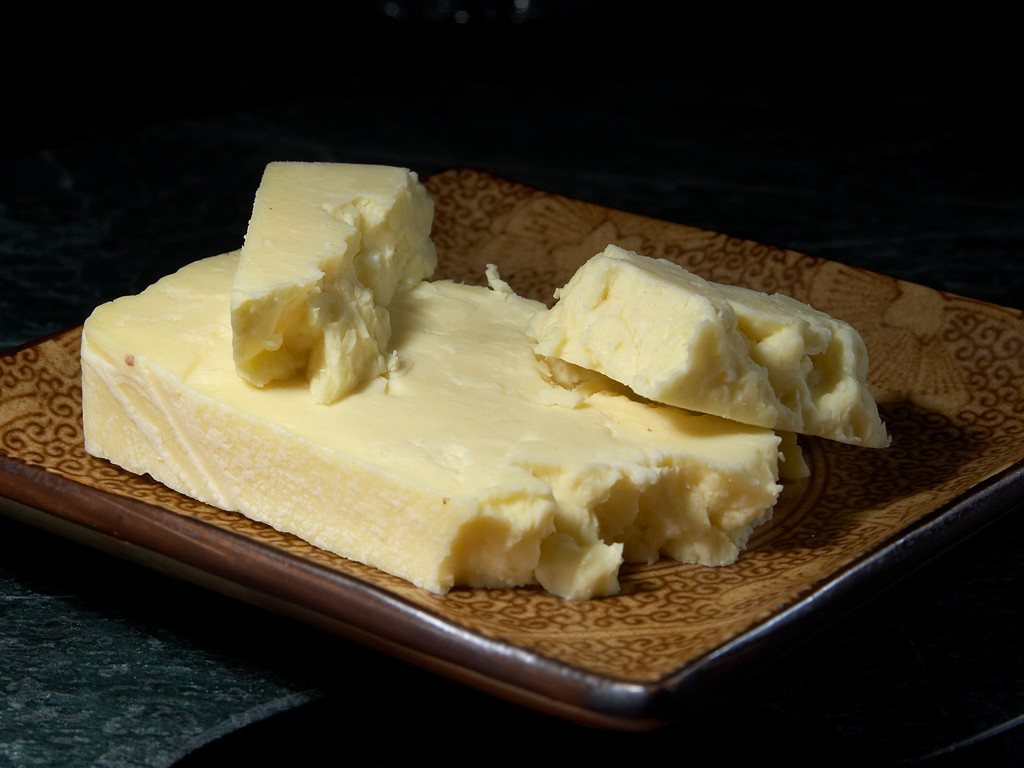
Wensleydale

Cheeses

- Ashdown Foresters — the Ashdown Forest heathland, East Sussex
- Beacon Fell Traditional Lancashire Cheese — Beacon Fell, Lancashire
- Beenleigh Blue — Beenleigh Manor, Harberton, Devon
- Brighton Blue — the city of Brighton, East Sussex
- Buxton Blue — the town of Buxton, Derbyshire
- Cheddar — the village of Cheddar, Somerset
- Cheshire — Cheshire county
- Coquetdale cheese — the valley of the River Coquet, Northumberland
- Cornish Blue, Cornish Brie and Cornish Yarg — the county of Cornwall
- Cotswold cheese — via Cotswold stone after the Cotswolds area
- Derby, Little Derby and Sage Derby — Derbyshire county
- Dorset Blue Vinney from Dorset county
- Dovedale — the valley of the River Dove, Central England
- Gloucester and Double Gloucester — the city of Gloucester
- Lancashire — Lancashire county
- Lincolnshire Poacher cheese — Lincolnshire county
- Norbury Blue — Norbury Park, Surrey
- Parlick Fell — the hill Parlick, Lancashire
- Red Leicester — the city of Leicester
- Red Windsor — the town of Windsor, Berkshire
- Shropshire Blue — Shropshire county
- Stilton and Stichelton — the village of Stilton, Cambridgeshire
- Sussex Slipcote — the historic county of Sussex
- Swaledale — Swaledale, a valley in North Yorkshire
- Wensleydale — Wensleydale, a valley in North Yorkshire

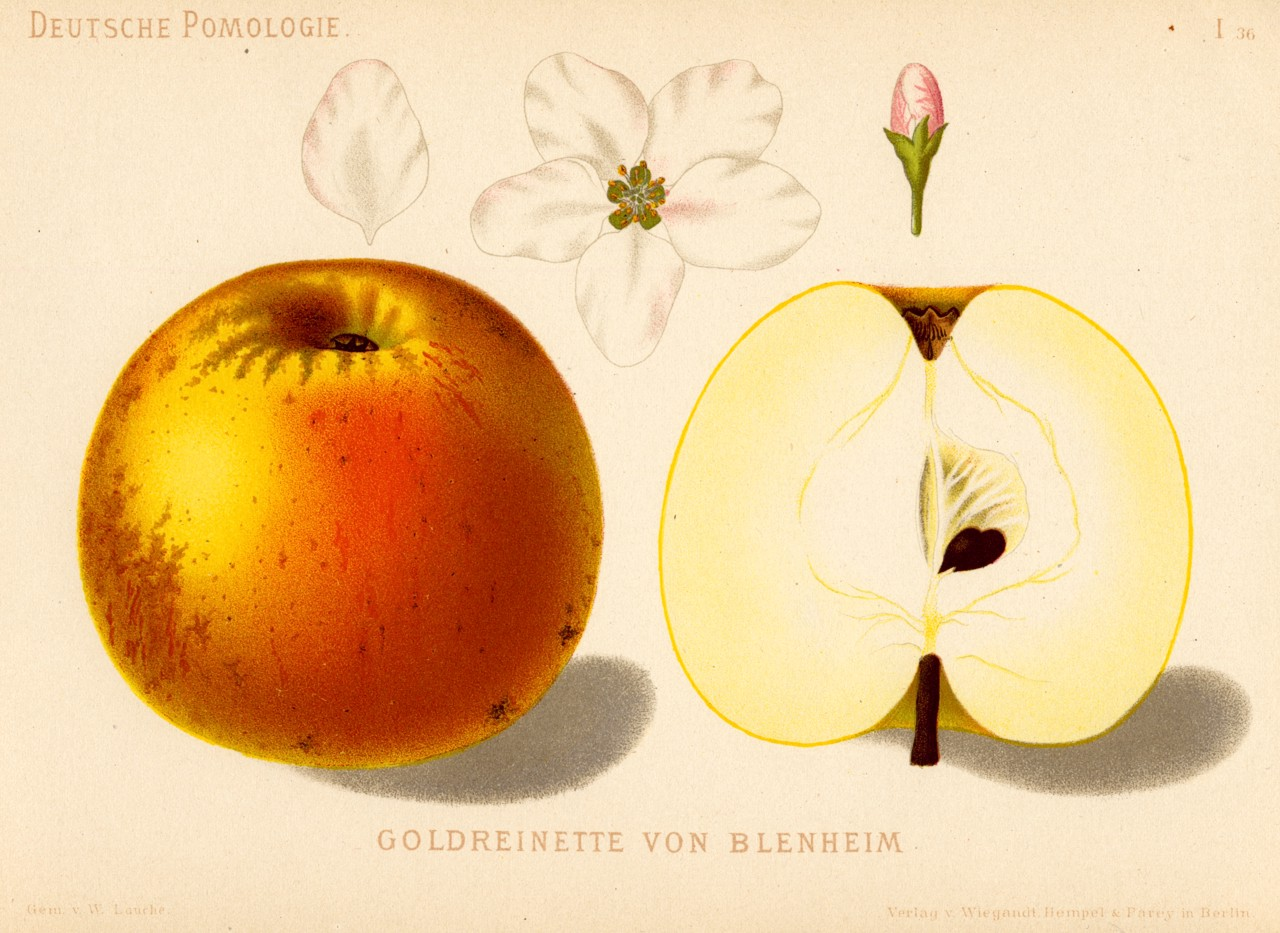
Blenheim Orange

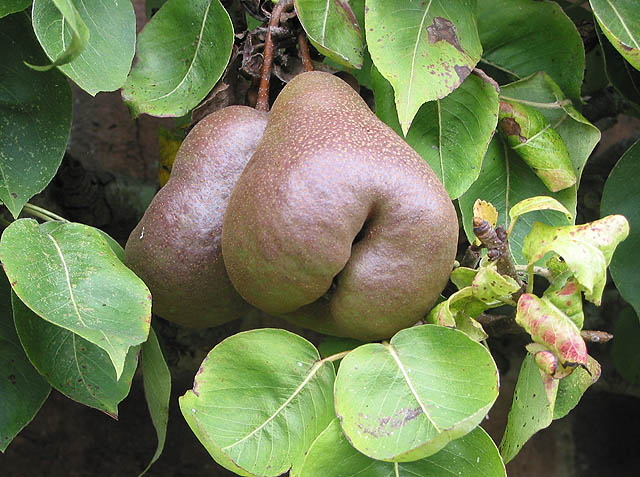
Warden pear

Fruits and vegetables

- Allington Pippin (apple) — the village of Allington, Lincolnshire
- Beauty of Bath (apple) — the city of Bath, Somerset
- Beauty of Kent (apple) — County Kent
- Blenheim Orange (apple) — the parish of Blenheim, Oxfordshire
- Chelmsford Wonder (apple) — the city of Chelmsford, Essex
- Claygate Pearmain (apple) — the village of Claygate, Surrey
- Cornish Aromatic and Cornish Gilliflower (apples) — the county of Cornwall
- Flower of Kent (apple) — County Kent
- Kingston Black Apple — the village of Kingston St Mary, Somerset
- Norfolk Biffin and Norfolk Pippin (apples) — the county of Norfolk
- Oxford Marmalade — a brand named after the city of Oxford
- Ribston Pippin (apple) — the estate of Ribston Hall, North Yorkshire
- Star of Devon (apple) — Devon County
- Sturmer Pippin (apple) — the village of Sturmer, Essex
- Upton Pyne apple — the village of Upton Pyne, Devon
- Warden pear — the village of Old Warden, Bedfordshire
- Worcester Pearmain (apple) — the city of Worcester
- Wyken Pippin (apple) — the village of Wyken, now a suburb of Coventry, West Midlands
- Yorkshire Forced Rhubarb — Yorkshire county

Meat products and dishes

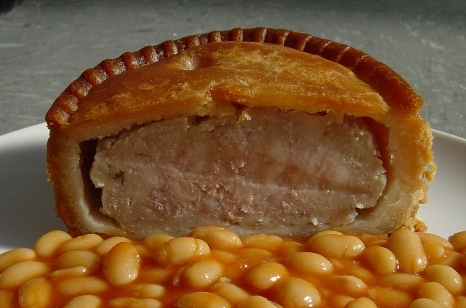
Melton Mowbray pork pie

- Cornish game hen — the county of Cornwall
- Cumberland sausage — the historic county of Cumberland
- Devon (sausage) — Australian meat product perhaps named after the county of Devon
- Lancashire hotpot — the county of Lancashire
- Lincolnshire sausage — the county of Lincolnshire
- Melton Mowbray pork pie — the town of Melton Mowbray, Leicestershire
- Newmarket sausage — the town of Newmarket, Suffolk

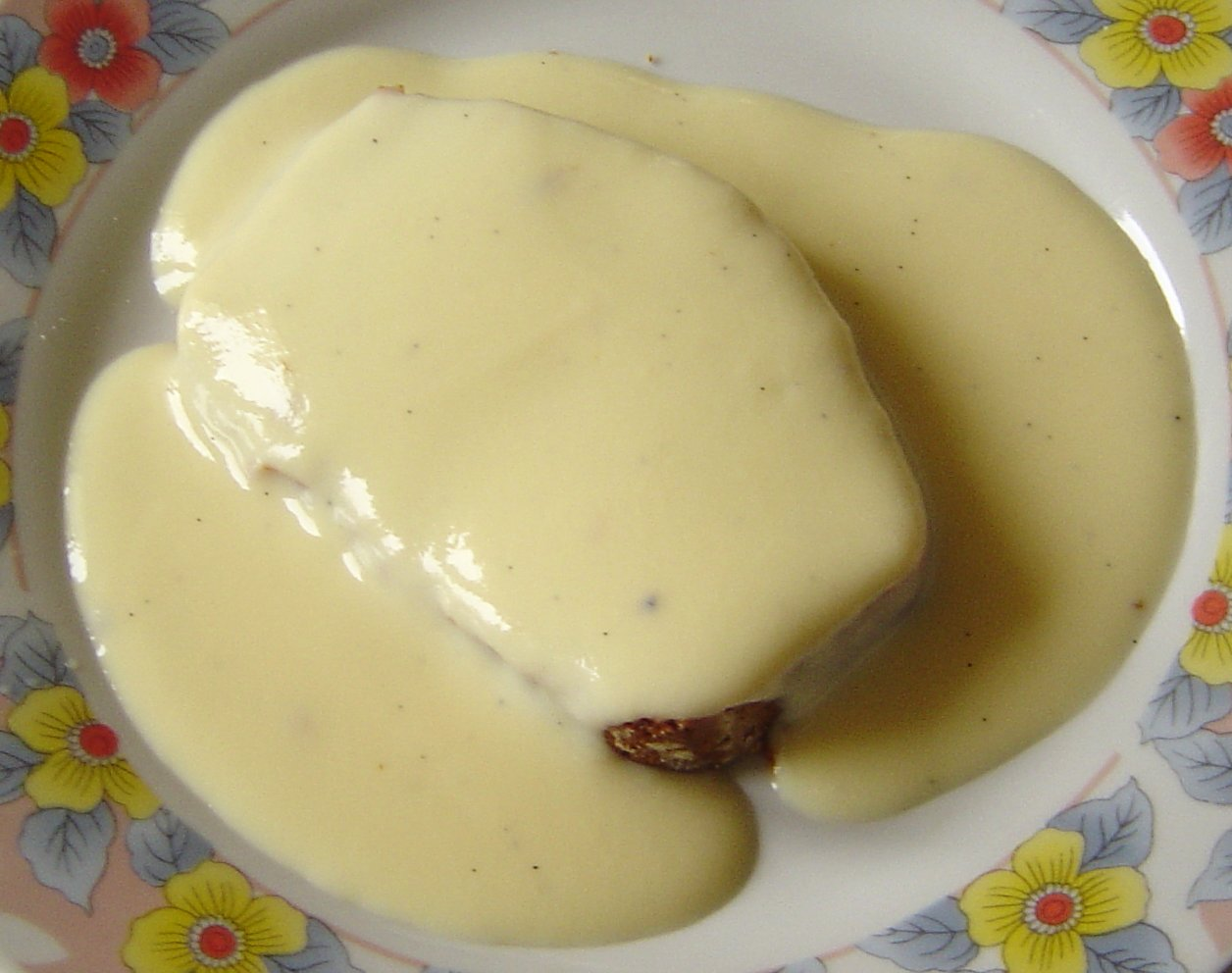
Creme anglaise over a piece of bread

- Oxford sausage — the city of Oxford
- York ham — the city of York, Yorkshire

Sauces and condiments

- Branston Pickle — the village of Branston, Staffordshire
- Crème anglaise — England
- Cumberland sauce — the historic county of Cumberland
- Tewkesbury mustard — the town of Tewkesbury, Gloucestershire
- Worcestershire sauce — the county of Worcestershire

===== Scotland =====
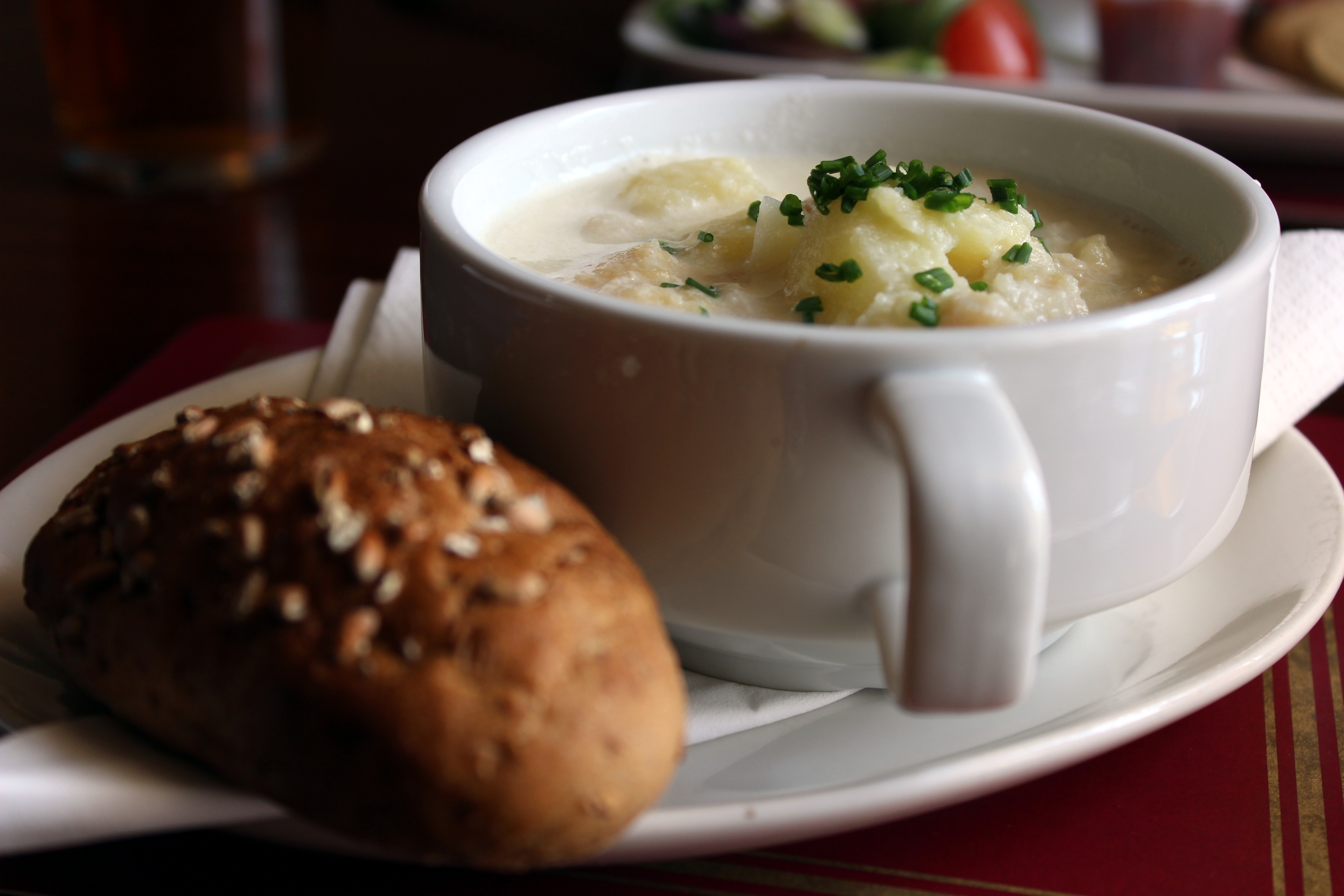
Cullen skink

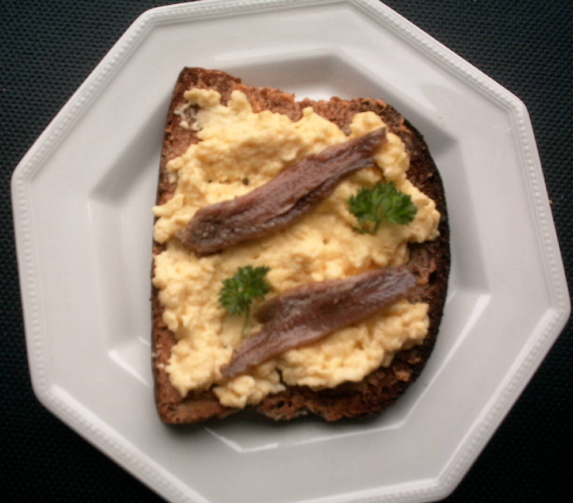
Scotch woodcock

- Aberdeen Angus — both the city of Aberdeen and the county of Angus
- Aberdeen roll — the city of Aberdeen
- Angus beef and Angus burger — the county of Angus
- Arbroath smokie — fish from the town of Arbroath, Angus
- Selkirk bannock — raisin bread from the town of Selkirk, Scottish Borders
- Bonchester cheese — Bonchester Bridge, Roxburghshire
- Cullen skink — soup from the village of Cullen, Moray
- Dundee cake — the city of Dundee
- Dunlop cheese — the town of Dunlop, East Ayrshire
- Ecclefechan tart — the village of Ecclefechan
- Forfar bridie — meat pastry from the town of Forfar, Angus
- Lanark Blue — cheese from Lanarkshire county
- Marauding Scot — fruit soaked in whisky
- Scotch broth
- Scotch egg
- Scotch pancake
- Scotch pie
- Scotch woodcock — eggs and anchovy on toast
- Shetland Black potato — the Shetland Islands
- Stornoway black pudding — the town of Stornoway, Outer Hebrides
- Teviotdale cheese — the valley of the River Teviot, Roxburghshire

===== Wales =====
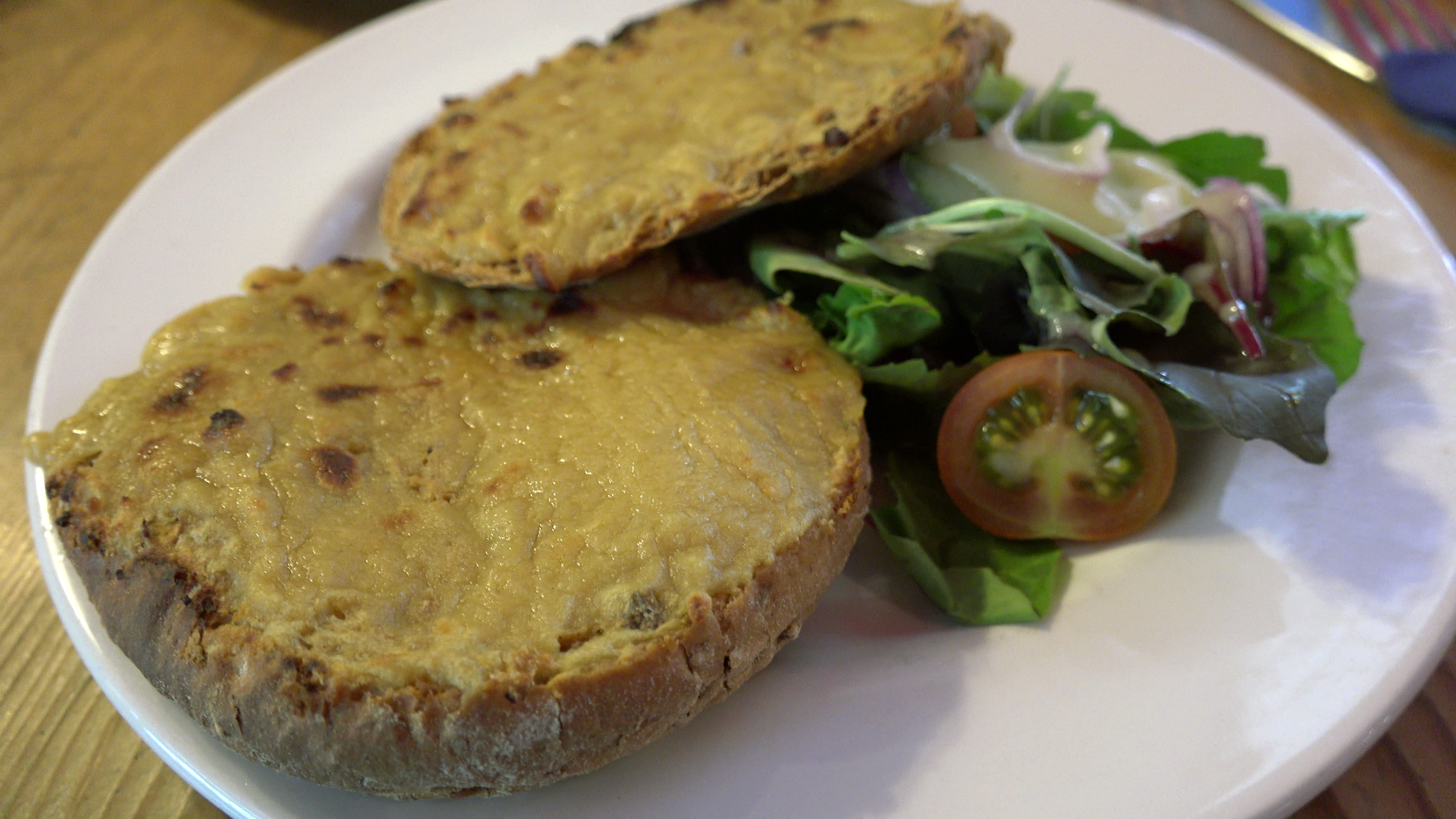
Welsh rarebit

- Bardsey apple — Bardsey Island
- Caerphilly cheese — the town of Caerphilly
- Glamorgan sausage — the historic county of Glamorgan
- Tintern cheese — the village of Tintern
- Welsh breakfast
- Welsh cake
- Welsh onion
- Welsh rarebit
- Y Fenni cheese — the Welsh name of Abergavenny

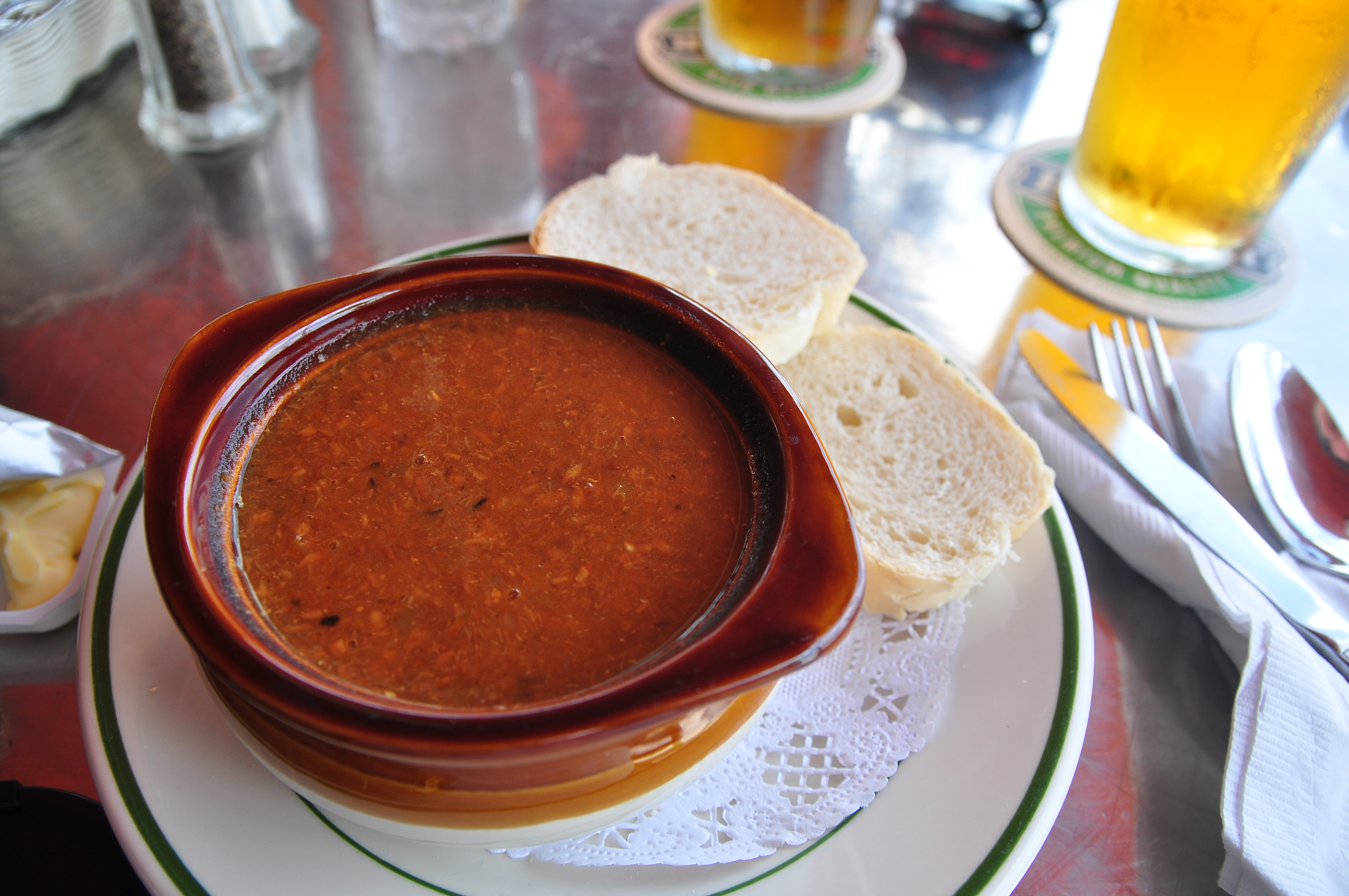
Bermuda fish chowder

== North America ==
- Bermuda fish chowder — the island nation of Bermuda

=== Canada ===
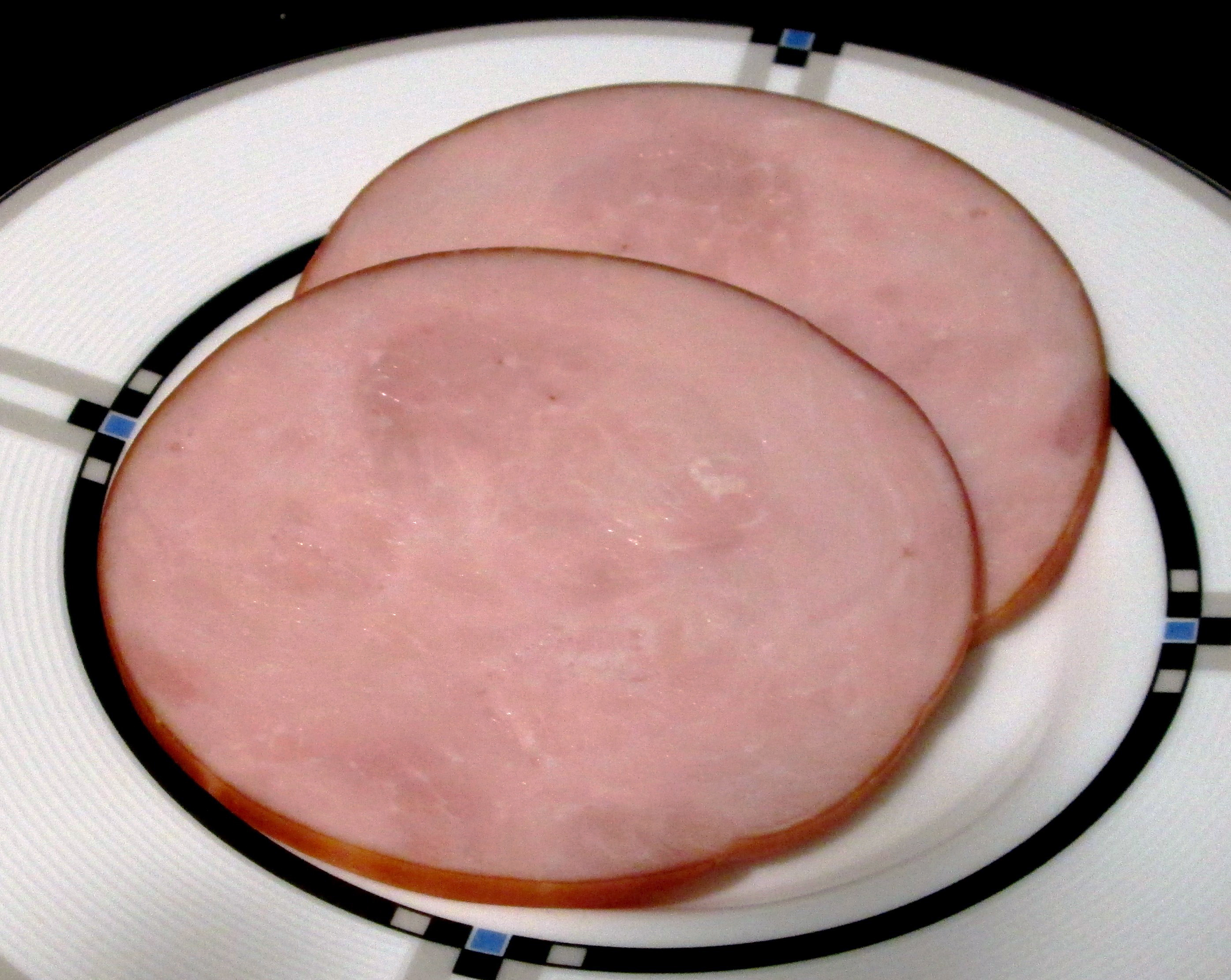
Canadian bacon

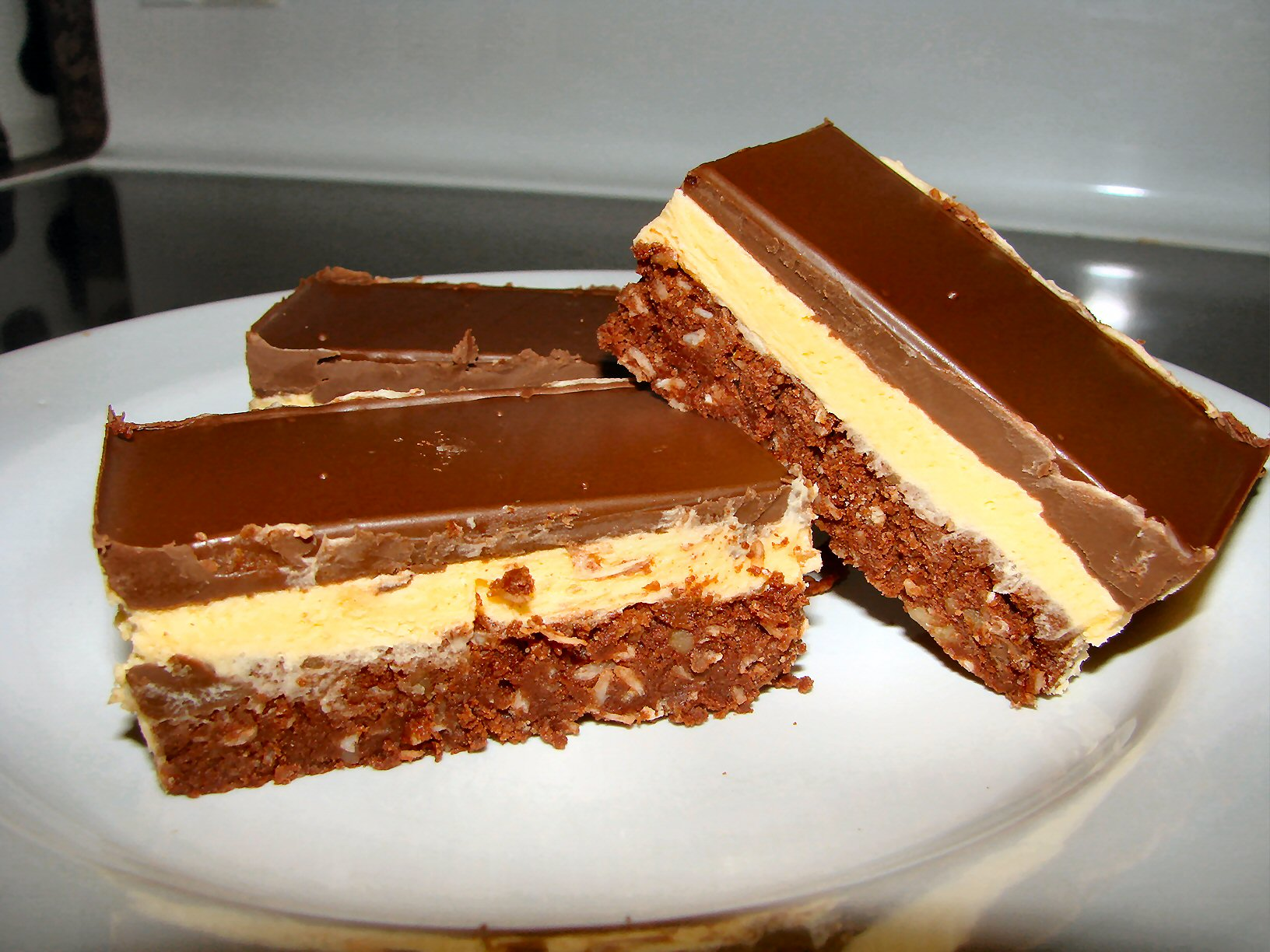
Nanaimo bars

- B.C. roll — the province of British Columbia
- Canadian bacon
- Canadian white bread
- Harovin Sundown pear — the town of Harrow, Ontario
- London broil — perhaps after London, Ontario
- Montreal hot dog — the city of Montreal, Quebec
- Montreal melon — Montreal
- Montreal-style bagel — Montreal
- Montreal-style smoked meat — Montreal
- Nanaimo bar — the city of Nanaimo, Vancouver Island, Canada
- Nova Scotia salmon — the province of Nova Scotia
- Oka cheese — originally manufactured by the Trappist monks in Oka, Quebec
- Pictou County Pizza — Pictou County, Nova Scotia
- Reinette du Canada — French apple named after Canada
- Saskatoonberry — Saskatoon, Saskatchewan (the city is named after the berry)
- Thousand Island dressing — the Thousand Islands archipelago in the St. Lawrence River
- Yukon Gold (potato) — the territory of Yukon

=== Caribbean ===
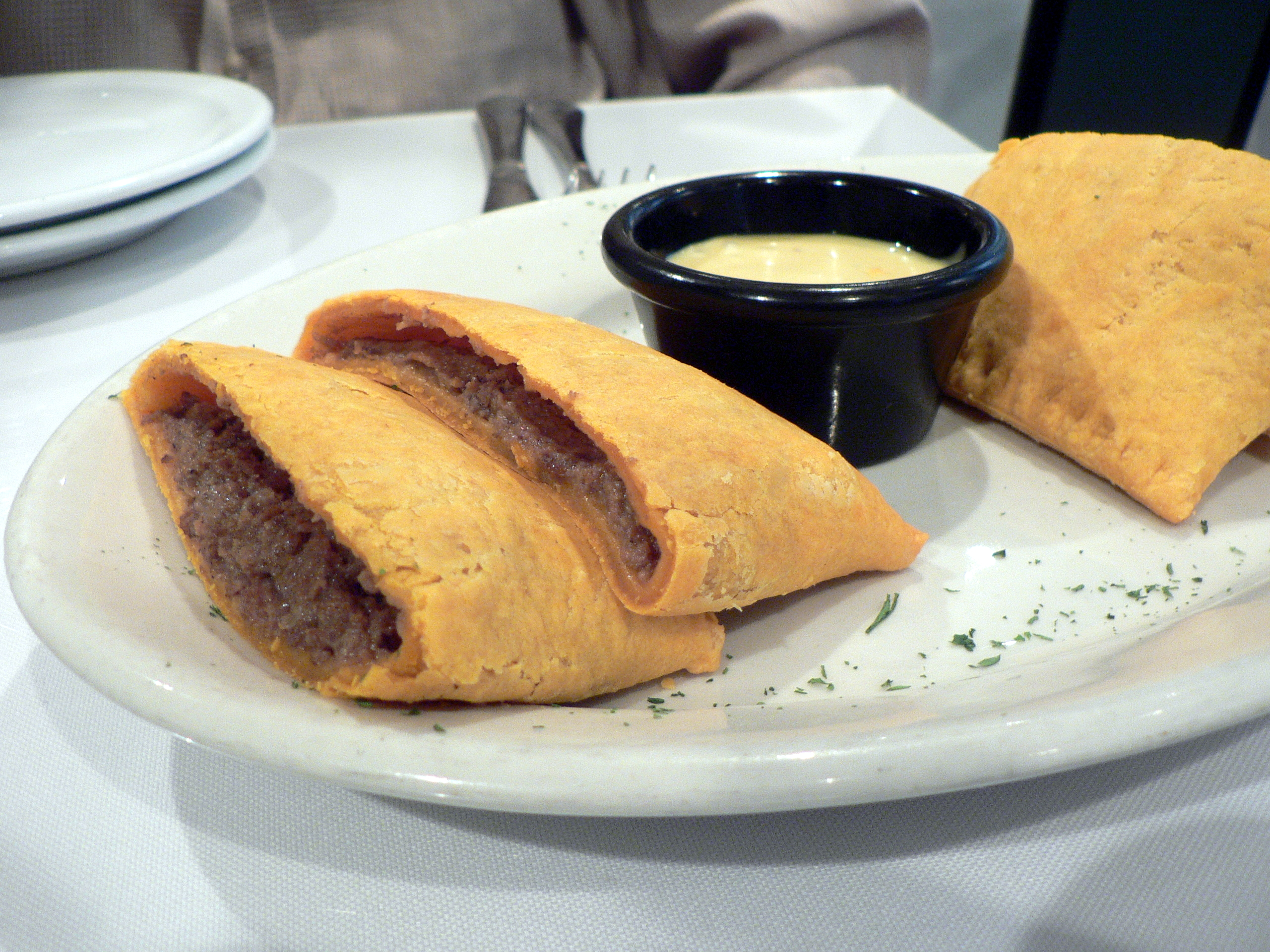
Jamaica beef patty

- Bajan pepper sauce — the island nation of Barbados
- Barbados cherry — Barbados
- Haitian patty — a savory pastry from Haiti
- Jamaican red banana — Jamaica
- Jamaican jerk spice — Jamaica]
- Jamaican patty — a savory pastry from Jamaica
- Trinidad moruga scorpion pepper — the district of Moruga, Trinidad

==== Cuba ====
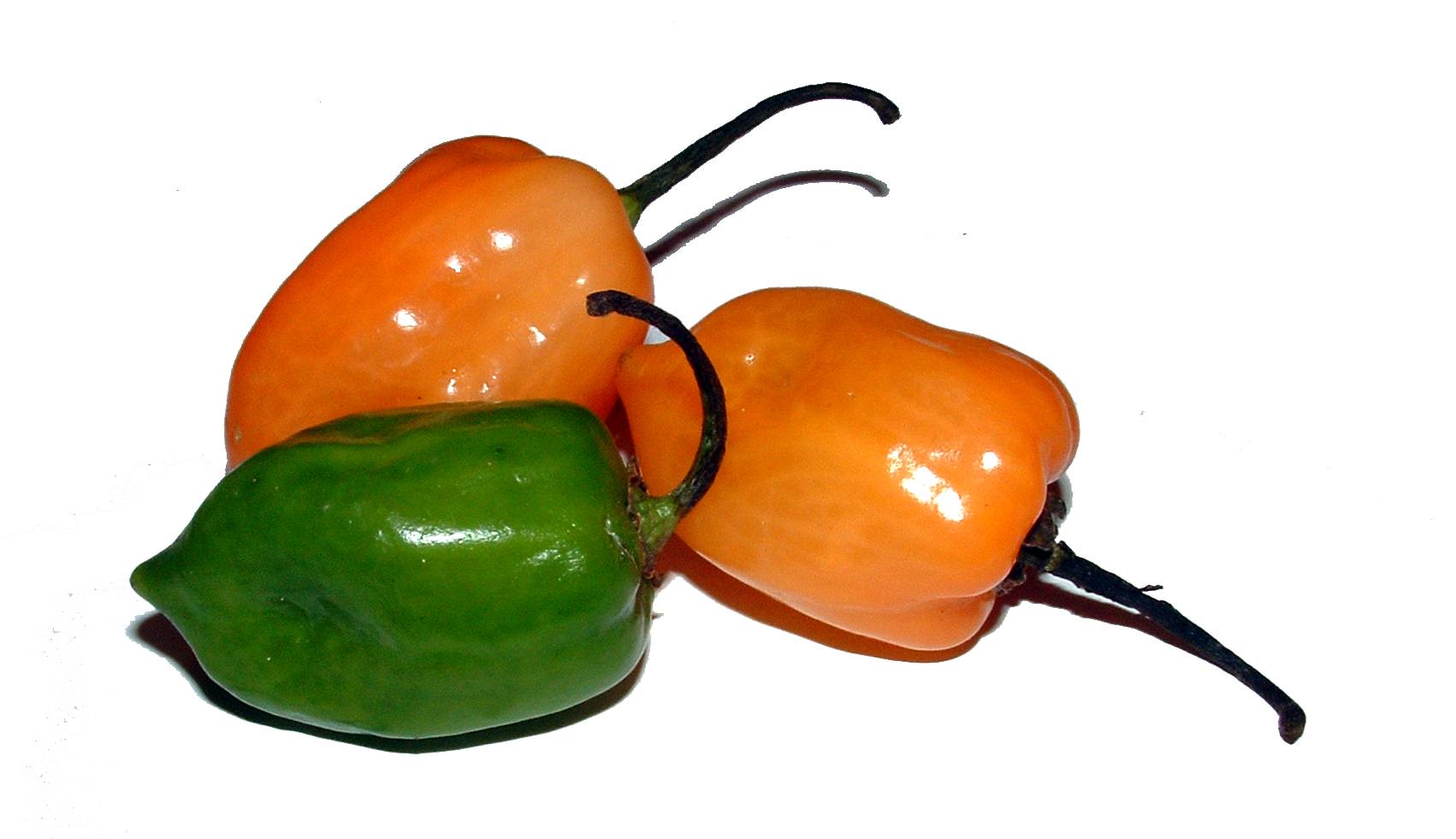
Habaneros

- Arroz a la cubana — "Cuban-style rice"
- Cuban bread
- Cuban oregano
- Cuban pastry
- Cuban sandwich
- Cubanelle pepper
- Habanero pepper — the city of Havana

=== Mexico ===
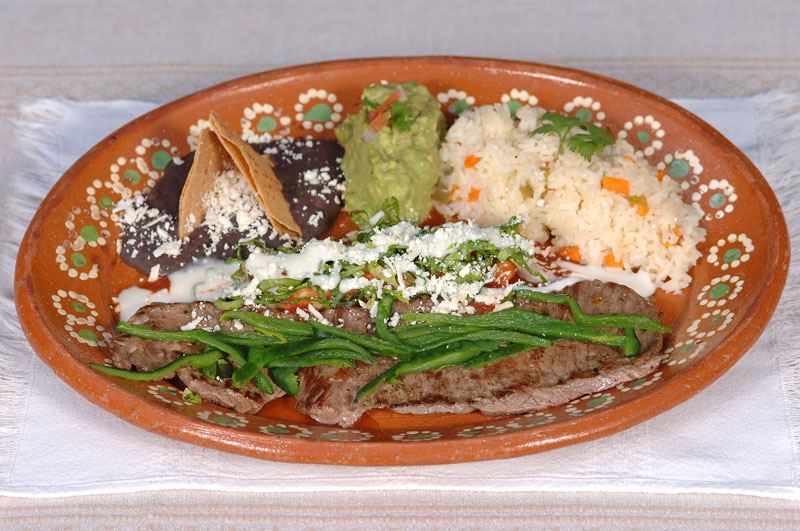
Carne a la tampiqueña

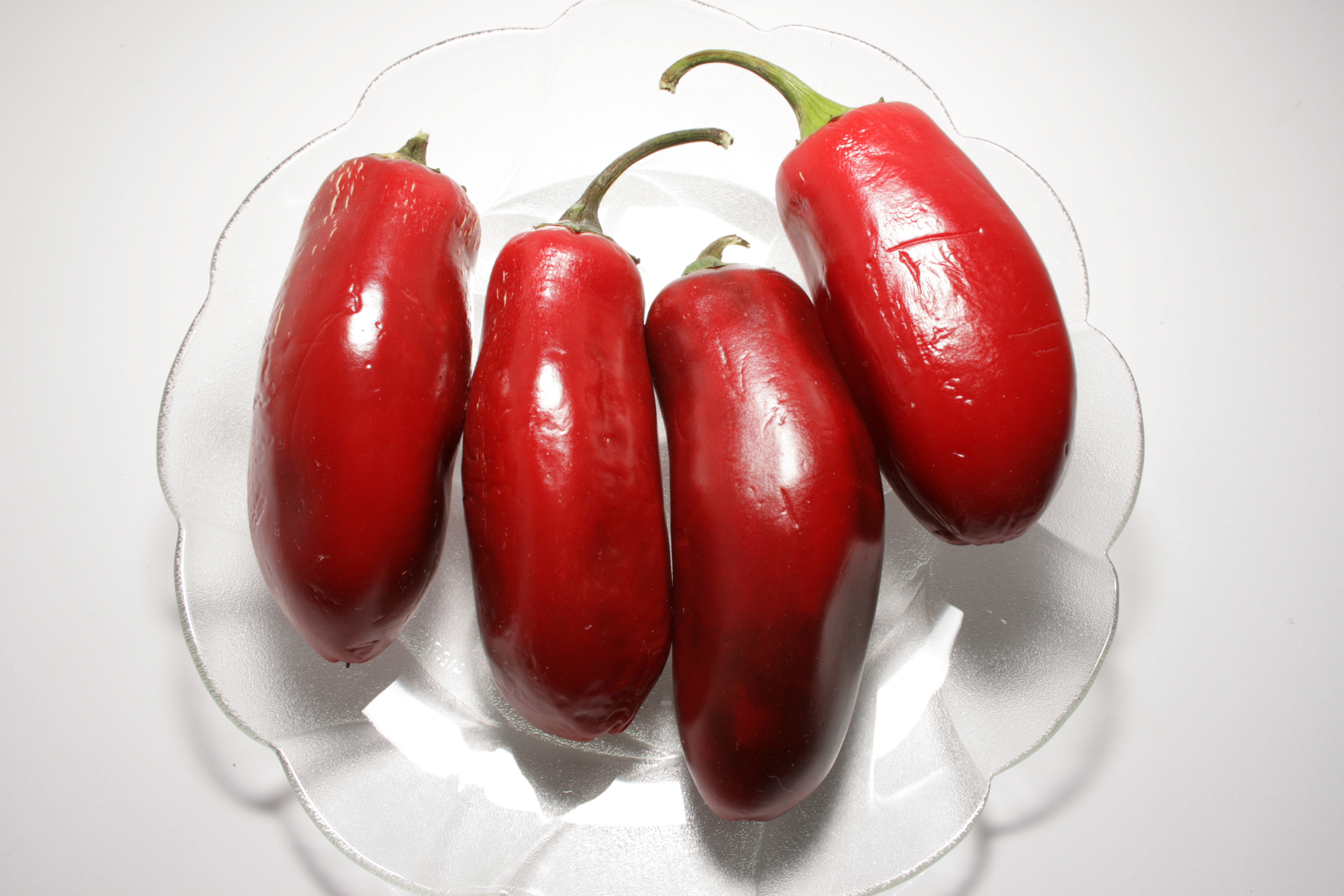
Jalapeños

- Carne a la tampiqueña — meat dish from the city of Tampico, Tamaulipas
- Chongos zamoranos — dessert from the city of Zamora, Michoacán
- Cotija cheese — the town of Cotija de la Paz, Michoacán
- Huachinango a la Veracruzana — fish dish from the state of Veracruz
- Huevos a la mexicana — "Mexican-style eggs"
- Jalapeño pepper — the city of Xalapa, Veracruz
- Mexican mint
- Mexican turnip
- Oaxaca cheese — the state or city of Oaxaca de Juarez
- Poblano pepper — the state or city of Puebla
- Queso Chihuahua — cheese from the state of Chihuahua
- Sonoran hot dog — the state of Sonora
- Tabasco pepper and Tabasco sauce — the state of Tabasco
- Tequila — the city of Tequila, Jalisco

=== United States ===
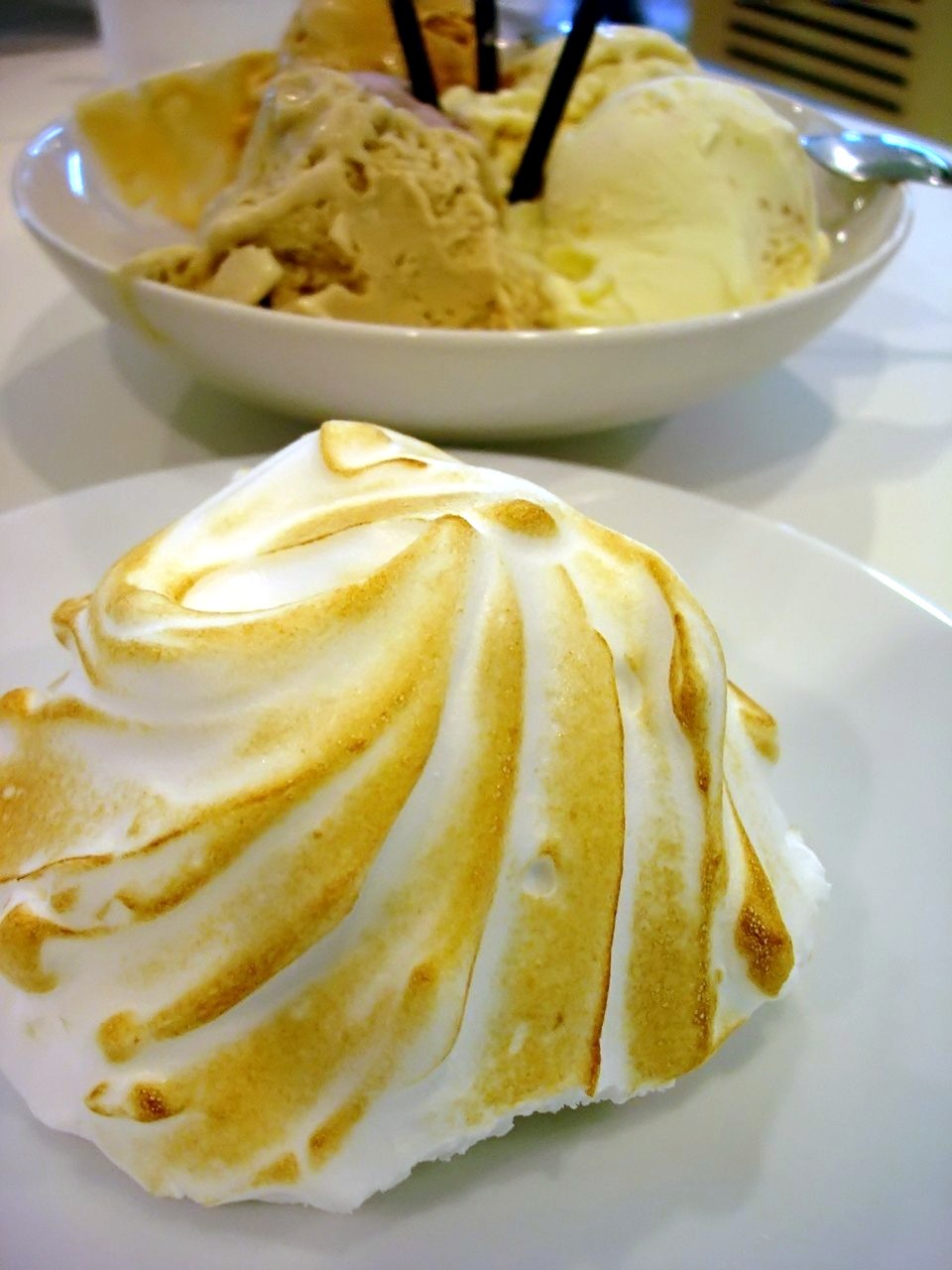
Baked Alaska

- Altoona-style pizza - Altoona, Pennsylvania
- American fried rice — Thai dish
- Baked Alaska — dessert named after the state of Alaska
- Calrose rice — the state of California
- Charleston red rice — the city of Charleston, South Carolina
- Denver omelette and Denver sandwich— the city of Denver, Colorado
- Hangtown fry omelette — the city of Placerville, California, between 1849 and 1854 known as "Hangtown"
- Hawaiian haystack — the state of Hawaii
- Ozark pudding — the Ozarks region of Missouri and Arkansas, USA
- Philadelphia Cream Cheese — the town of Philadelphia, Pennsylvania
- California burrito - the state of California

Baked goods

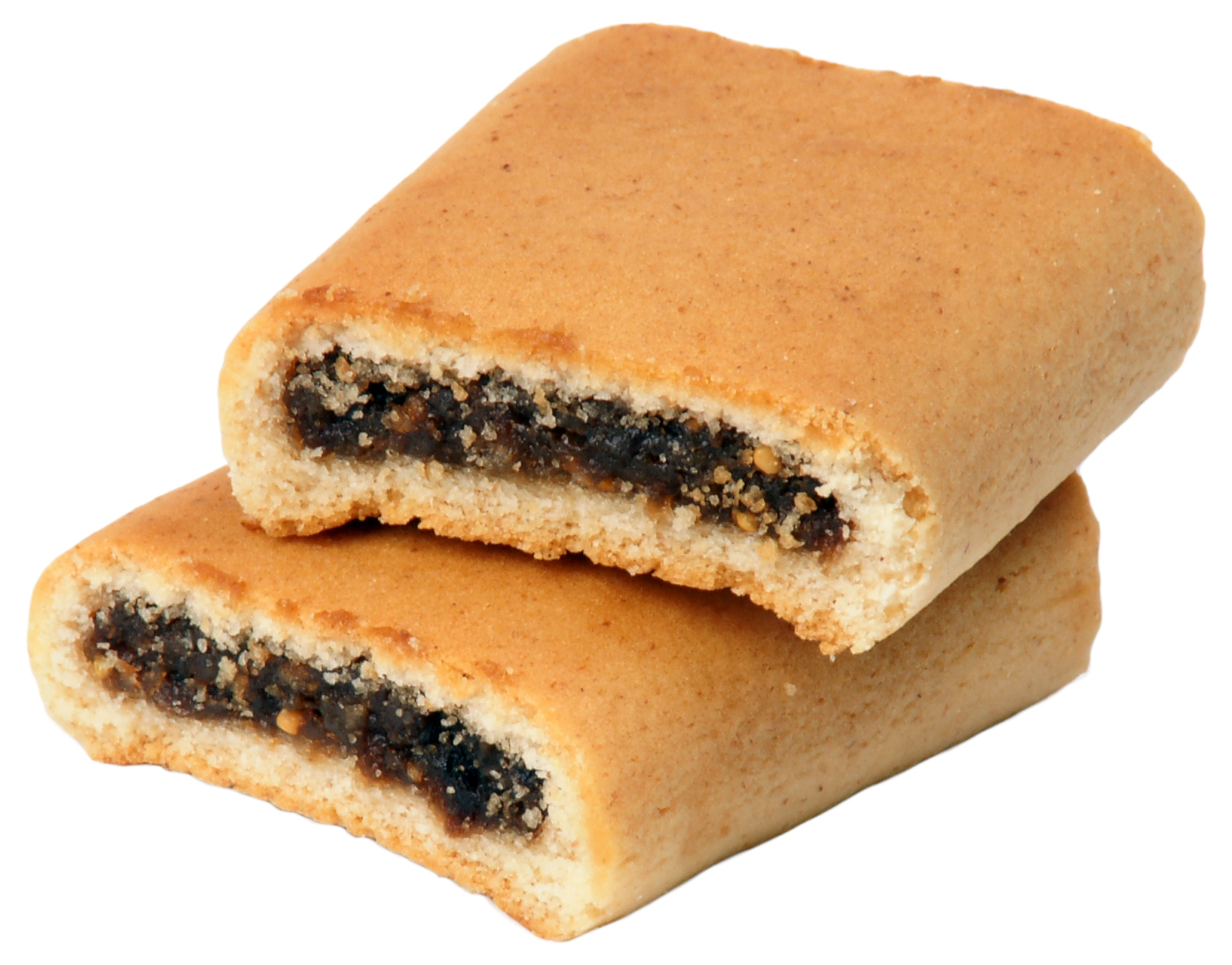
Fig Newtons

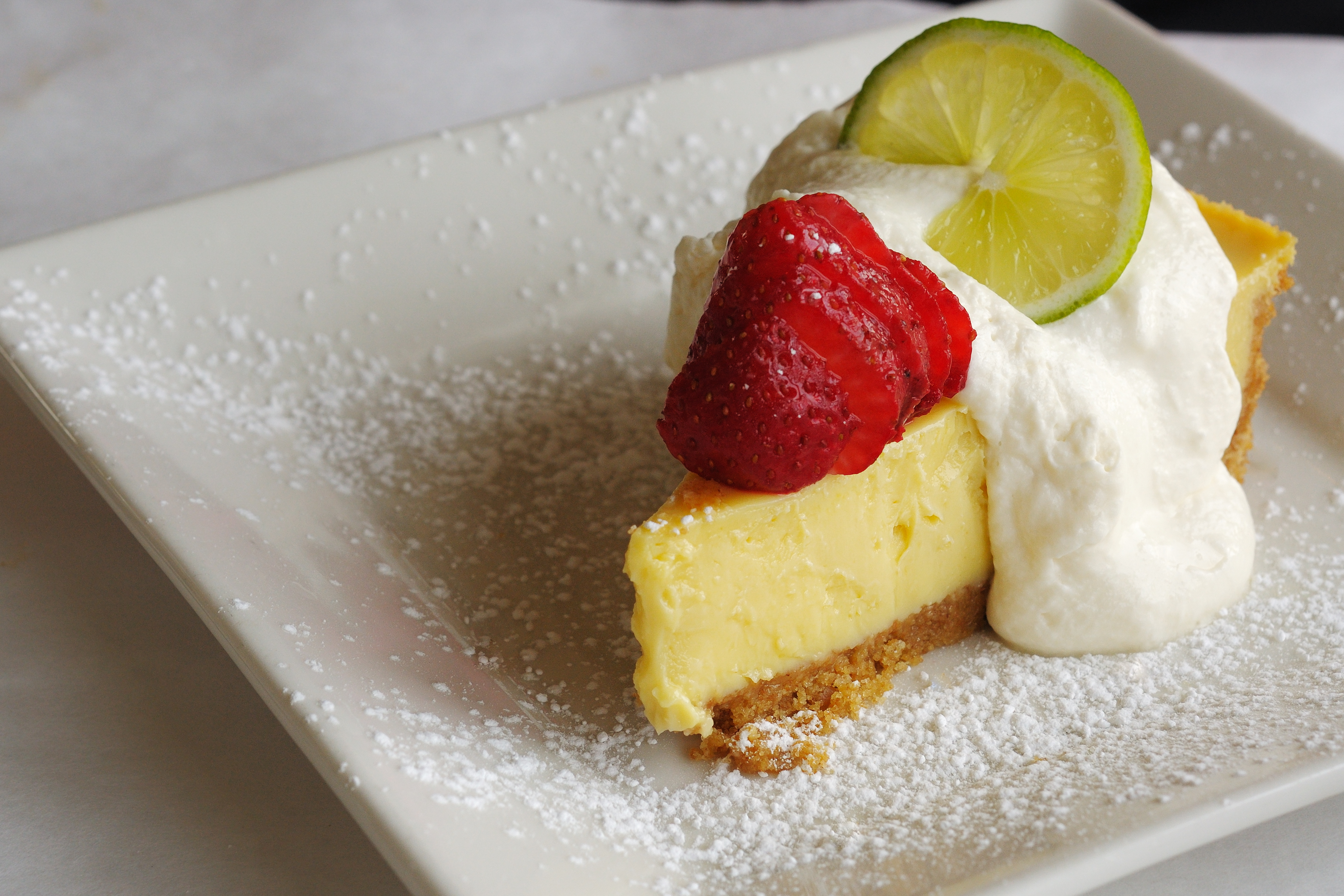
Key lime pie

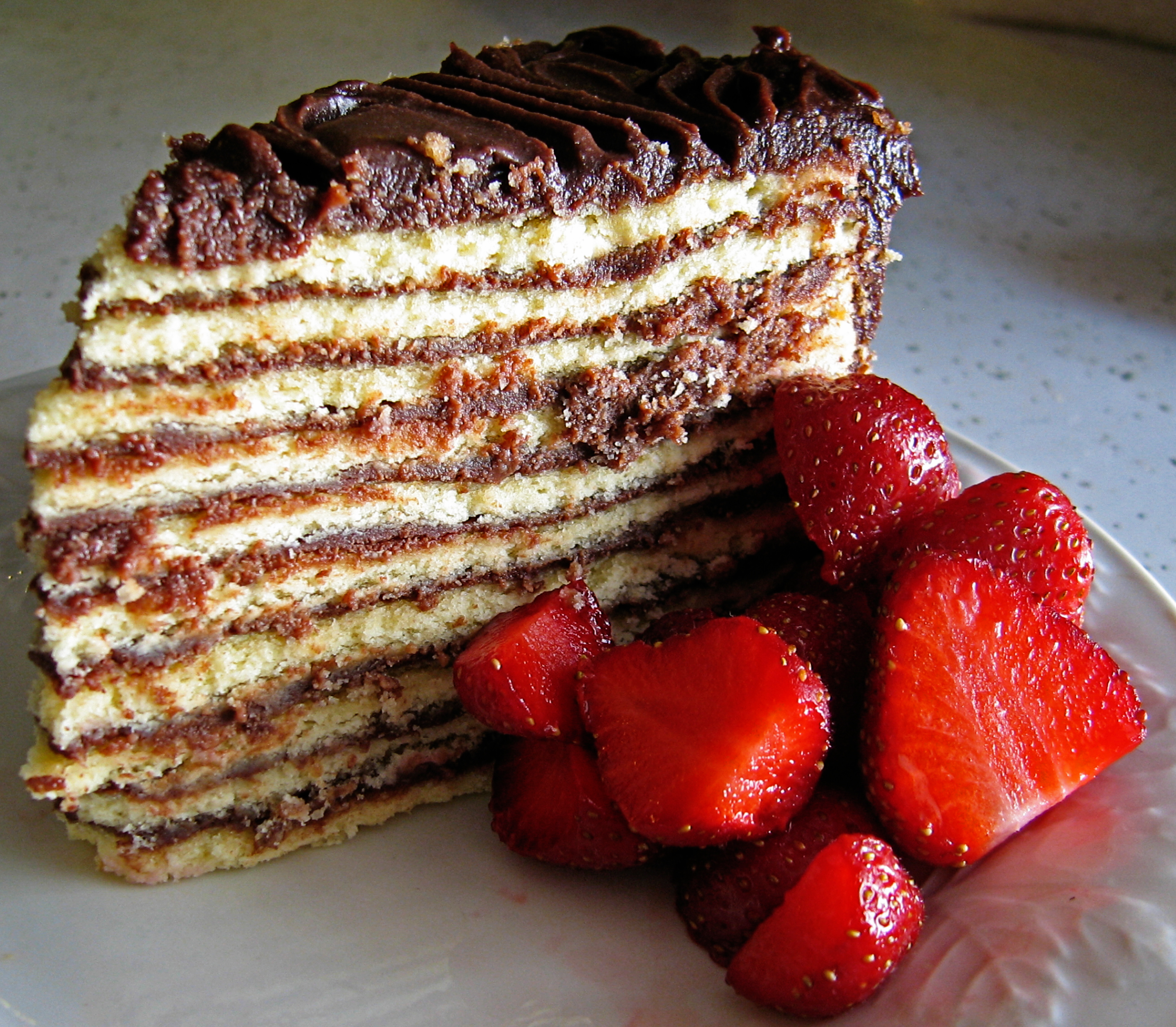
Smith island cake

- American muffin
- Boston brown bread, Boston cream doughnut and Boston cream pie — the city of Boston, Massachusetts
- California-style pizza — the state of California
- New York cheesecake — New York City
- Chicago-style pizza — the city of Chicago, Illinois
- Detroit-style pizza — the city of Detroit, Michigan
- Fig Newton — the city of Newton, Massachusetts
- Hawaiian pizza— the state of Hawaii
- Kentucky jam cake — the state of Kentucky, USA
- Key lime pie — via the Key lime from the Florida Keys islands
- Mississippi mud pie — the Mississippi River
- New England brown bread — the New England region
- New Haven-style pizza — the city of New Haven, Connecticut
- New York-style bagel, New York-style pastrami and New York-style pizza — New York City
- Parker House roll — the Parker House Hotel in Boston, Massachusetts
- Quad City-style pizza — the Quad Cities in Iowa and Illinois
- Smith Island cake — Smith Island, Maryland
- St. Louis-style pizza — the city of St. Louis, Missouri
- St. Paul sandwich — the city of Saint Paul, Minnesota
- Texas toast — the state of Texas
- Toast Hawaii — the state of Hawaii

Cheeses

- American cheese — common name for processed cheese.
- Colby cheese — Colby, Wisconsin
- Cuba cheese — Cuba, New York
- Monterey Jack — Monterey, California (not Monterrey, Mexico)
- Pinconning cheese — the city of Pinconning, Michigan

Fruits, nuts and vegetables

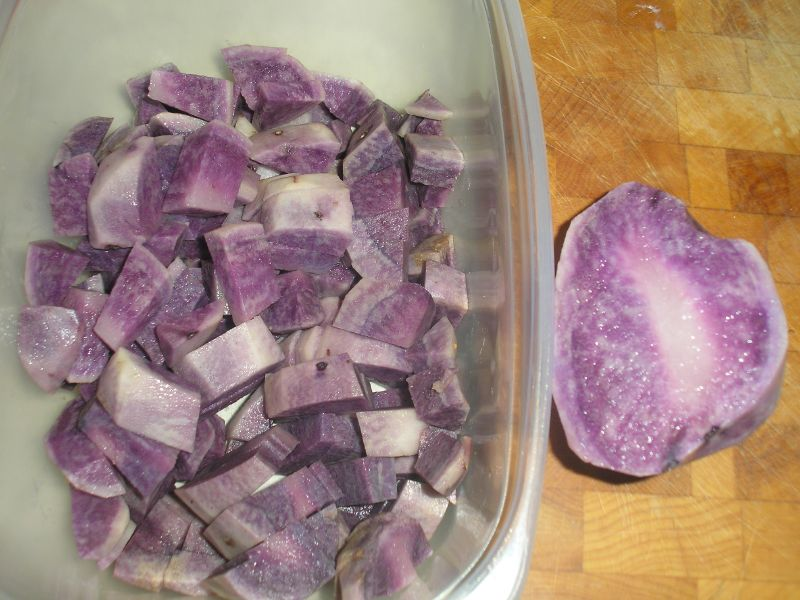
Adirondack Blue potatoes

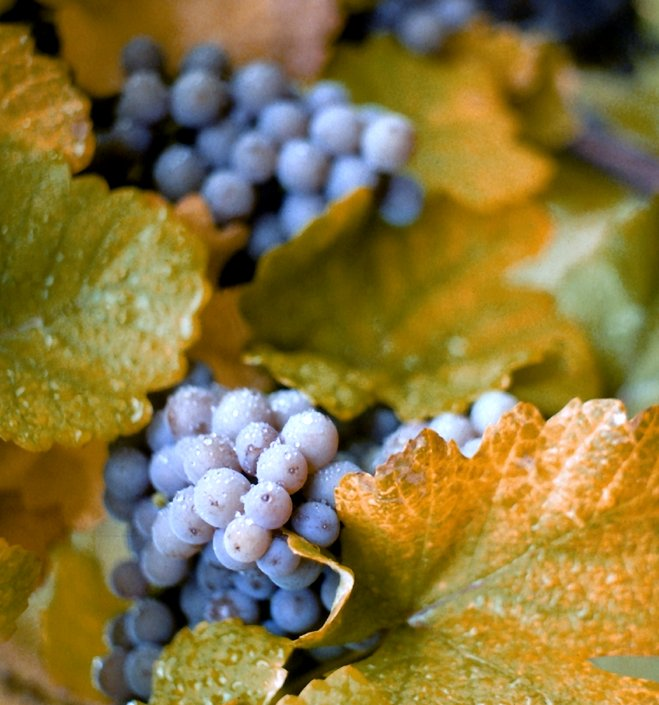
Concord grapes

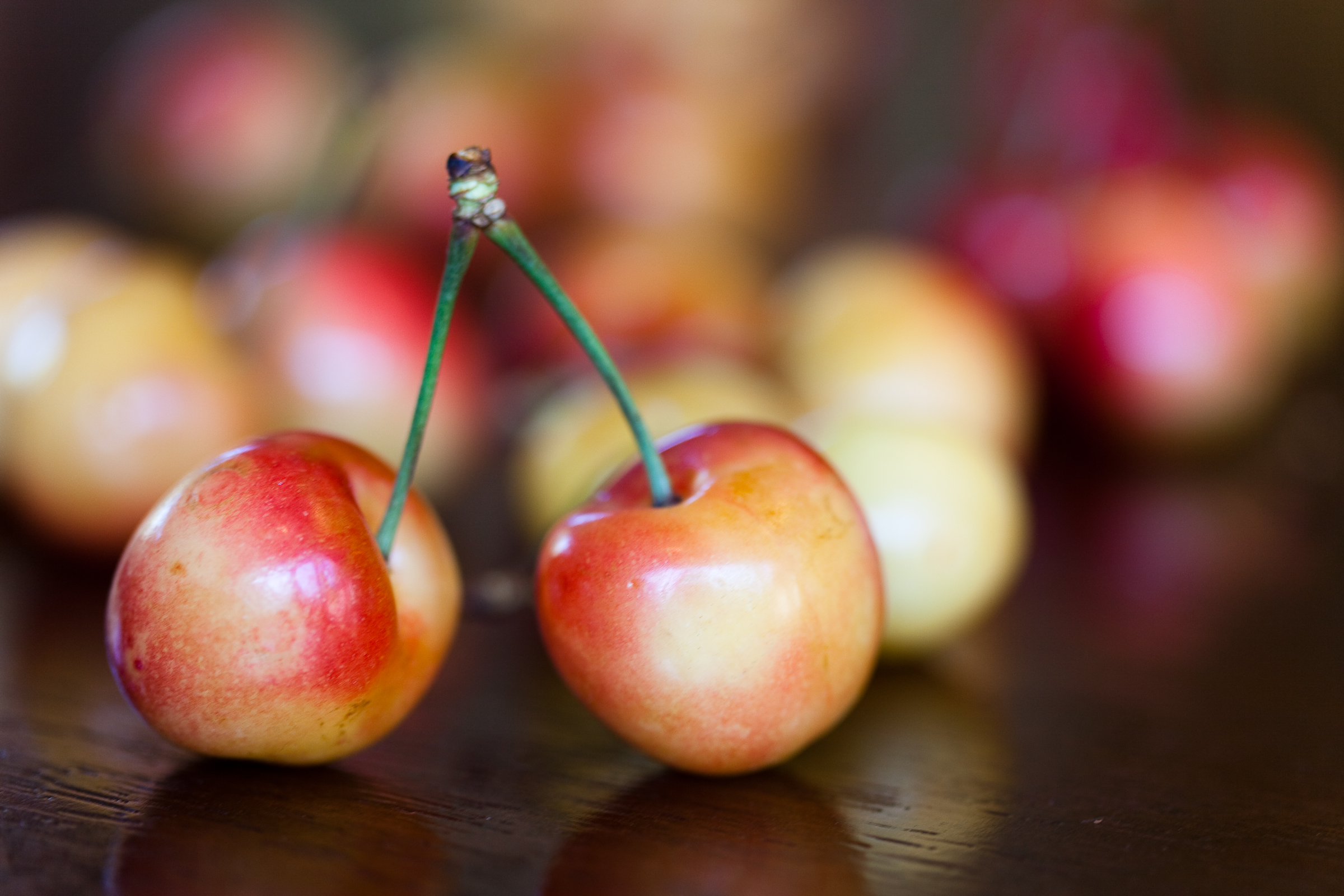
Rainier cherries

- Adirondack Blue and Red potatoes — the Adirondack Mountains, New York
- Anaheim pepper — the city of Anaheim, California
- Arkansas Black apple — the state of Arkansas
- Arkansas Traveler tomato — the state of Arkansas
- Boston baked beans — the city of Boston, Massachusetts
- Canadice grape— Canadice Lake, New York
- Carolina Reaper pepper — the state of South Carolina
- Concord grape — the town of Concord, Massachusetts
- Cortland apple — Cortland County, New York
- Delaware grape — the town of Delaware, Ohio
- Esopus Spitzenburg apple — the town of Esopus, New York
- Fresno chile — the city of Fresno, California
- Hanover tomato — Hanover County, Virginia
- Idared apple — the state of Idaho
- Key lime — the Florida Keys archipelago, south Florida
- Lakemont grape— the hamlet of Lakemont, New York
- Michigan salad — the state of Michigan
- New Mexico chile pepper — the state of New Mexico
- Newtown Pippin apple — the village of Newton, now a borough of New York City known as Elmhurst, Queens
- Rainier cherry — Mount Rainier, Washington
- Rhode Island Greening apple — the state of Rhode Island
- Rome Beauty apple — Rome Township, Lawrence County, Ohio
- Roxbury Russet apple — the former town of Roxbury, Boston, Massachusetts
- Santa Fe Grande pepper — the city of Santa Fe, New Mexico
- Texas caviar — pea salad from the state of Texas
- Tompkins King apple — Tompkins County, New York
- Ulster cherry — Ulster County, New York
- Vidalia onion — the city of Vidalia, Georgia
- Virginia peanut — the state of Virginia
- Wolf River apple — the Wolf River in Wisconsin
- York Imperial apple — the city of York, Pennsylvania

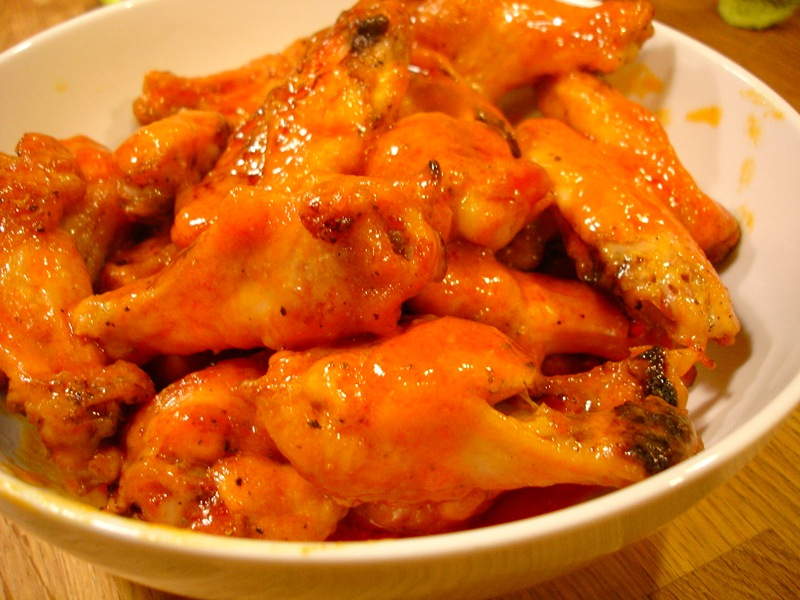
Buffalo wings

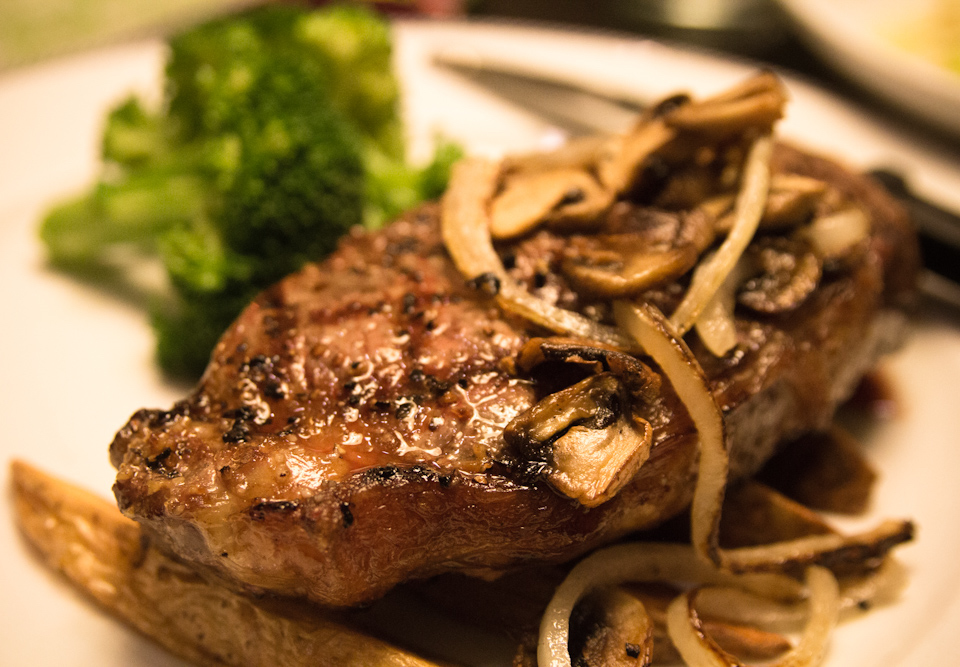
New York strip steak a.k.a. Kansas City strip steak

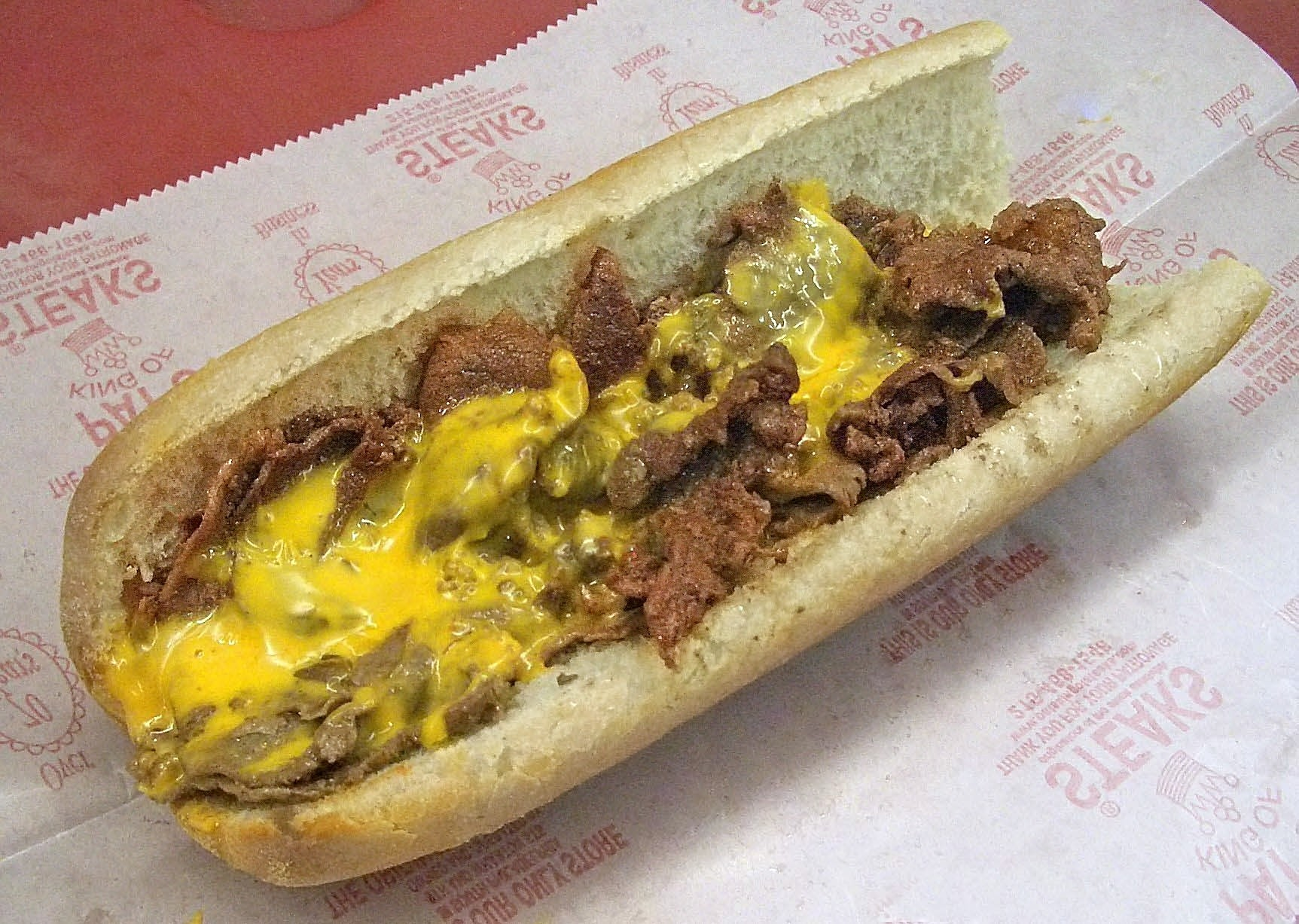
Philly cheesesteak

Meat products and dishes

- American chop suey — ground beef pasta dish basically unrelated to chop suey
- American goulash
- Barberton chicken — the city of Barberton, Ohio
- Beef Manhattan — the borough of Manhattan, New York City
- Bourbon chicken — Bourbon Street in New Orleans Louisiana
- Buffalo wing — the city of Buffalo, New York
- Chicago-style hot dog — the city of Chicago
- Chicken Maryland — the state of Maryland
- Carolina burger — the states of The Carolinas
- Coney Island hot dog — Coney Island, Brooklyn, New York City
- Filet américain or steack à l'Americaine — "American steak"
- Kansas City strip steak and Kansas City-style barbecue — Kansas City, Missouri
- Kentucky hot brown — meat sandwich from the state of Kentucky
- Lebanon bologna — the city of Lebanon, Pennsylvania
- California burger — the state of California
- Maxwell Street Polish — the Maxwell Street market in Chicago, Illinois
- Memphis-style barbecue — the city of Memphis, Tennessee
- Michigan hot dog — the state of Michigan
- Nashville hot chicken — the city of Nashville, Tennessee
- New York strip steak — New York City
- Philadelphia Pepper Pot — the city of Philadelphia, Pennsylvania
- Philly cheesesteak — the city of Philadelphia, Pennsylvania
- Pittsburgh rare steak — the city of Pittsburgh, Pennsylvania
- Rocky Mountain oysters — testicle dish named after the Rocky Mountains
- Seattle-style hot dog — the city of Seattle, Washington
- Smithfield ham — the town of Smithfield, Virginia
- Southern Louisiana Ponce — the state of Louisiana
- St. Louis-style barbecue — the city of St. Louis, Missouri
- Texas hot dog and Texas Tommy (hot dog) — the state of Texas

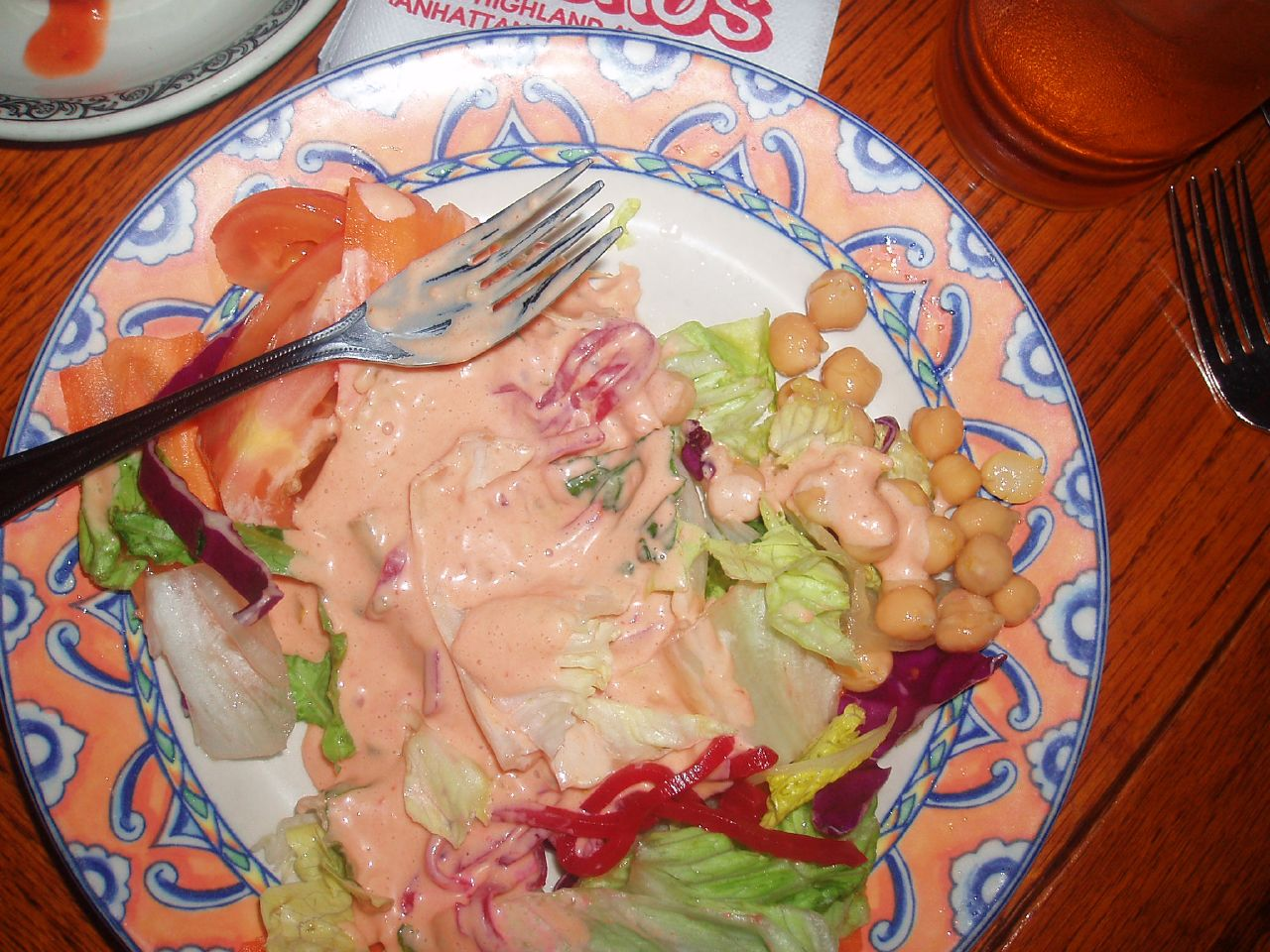
Thousand Island dressing on a salad

- Virginia ham — the state of Virginia
- Santa Maria-style barbecue — Santa Maria Valley, California

Sauces, dressings and condiments

- Buffalo sauce — the city of Buffalo, New York
- Carolina style condiments — the state of North Carolina
- Catalina dressing — Santa Catalina Island, California
- Cincinnati chili — meat sauce from the city of Cincinnati, Ohio, USA
- Thousand Island dressing — the Thousand Islands archipelago in the St Lawrence river

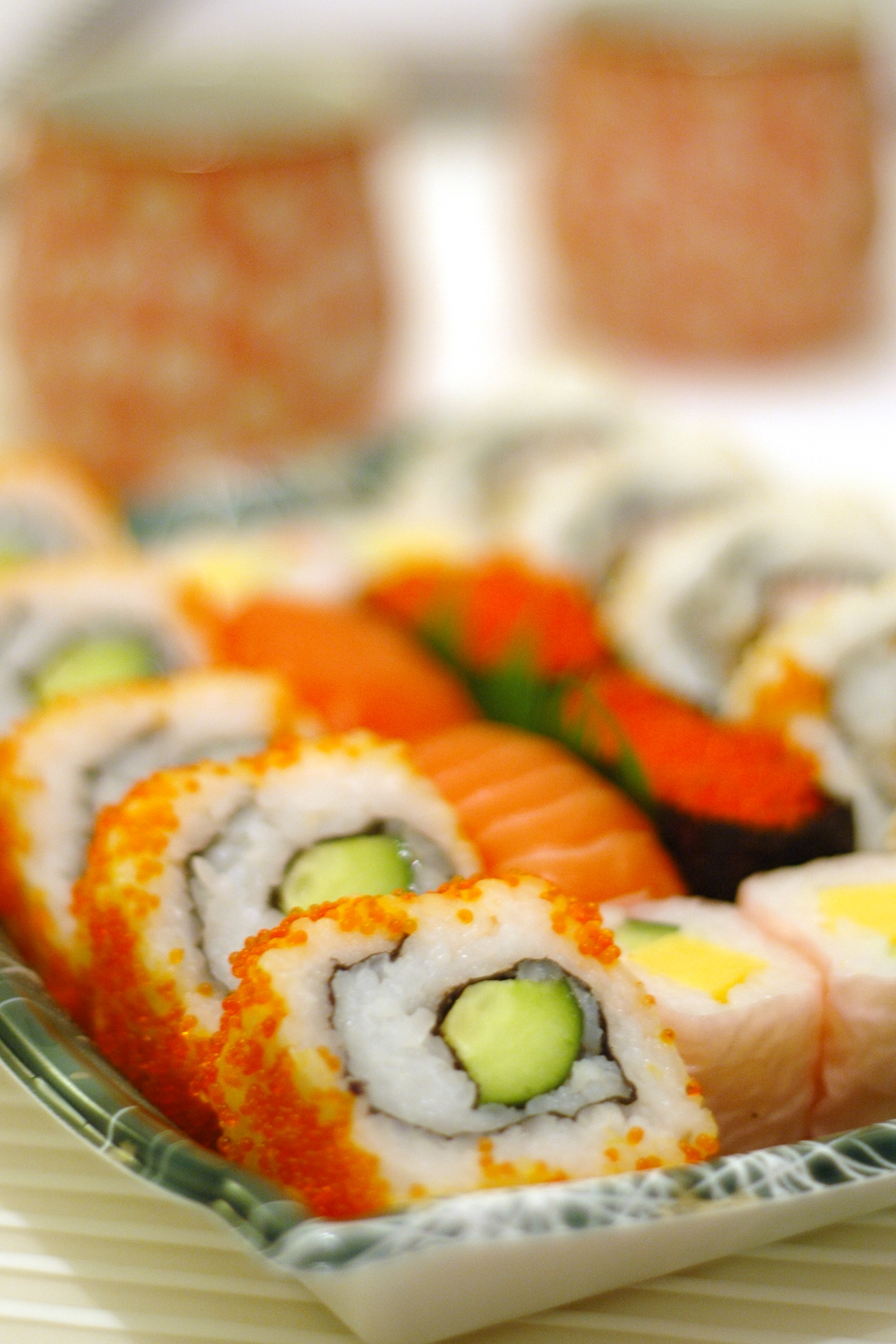
California rolls

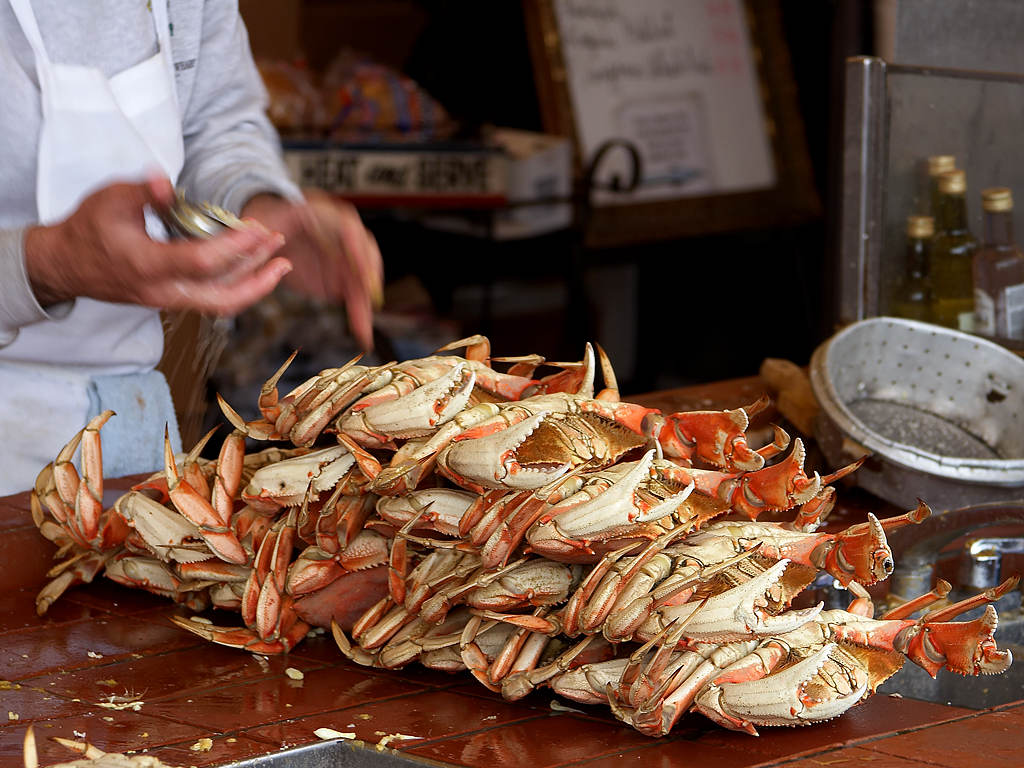
Dungeness crabs

Seafood

- California roll — sushi roll named after the state of California
- Delaware clam chowder — the state of Delaware
- Dungeness crab — the town of Dungeness, Washington
- Hatteras clam chowder — the beach or island of Hatteras, North Carolina
- Long Island clam chowder — Long Island, New York State
- Manhattan clam chowder — the borough of Manhattan, New York City
- Maryland Blue Crab — the state of Maryland
- Maryland crab soup — the state of Maryland, USA
- New England clam chowder — the New England region
- New Jersey clam chowder — the state of New Jersey
- Philadelphia roll — sushi roll named via the cream cheese after the town of Philadelphia, New York
- Rhode Island clam chowder — the state of Rhode Island
- Seattle roll — sushi roll named after the city of Seattle, Washington

== Oceania ==
- Anzac - A biscuit

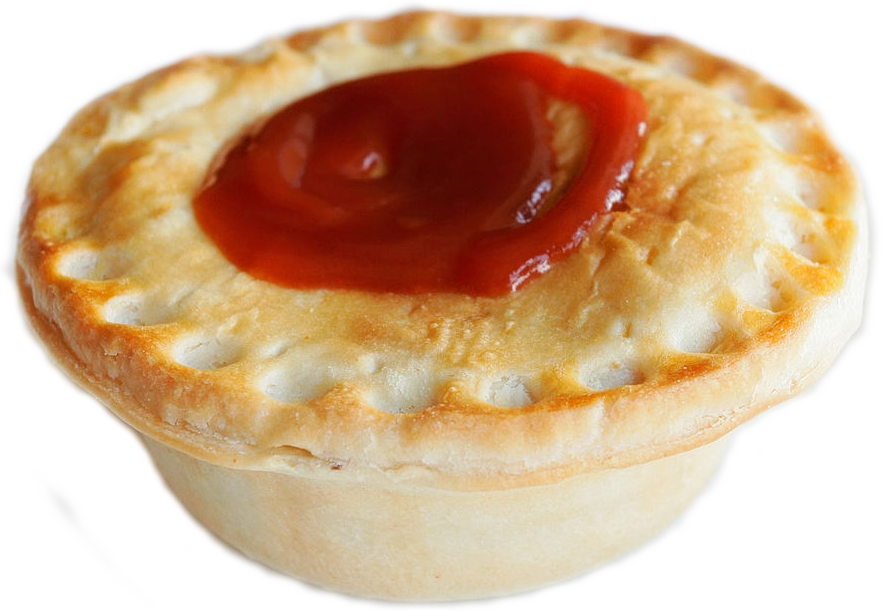
Australian meat pie

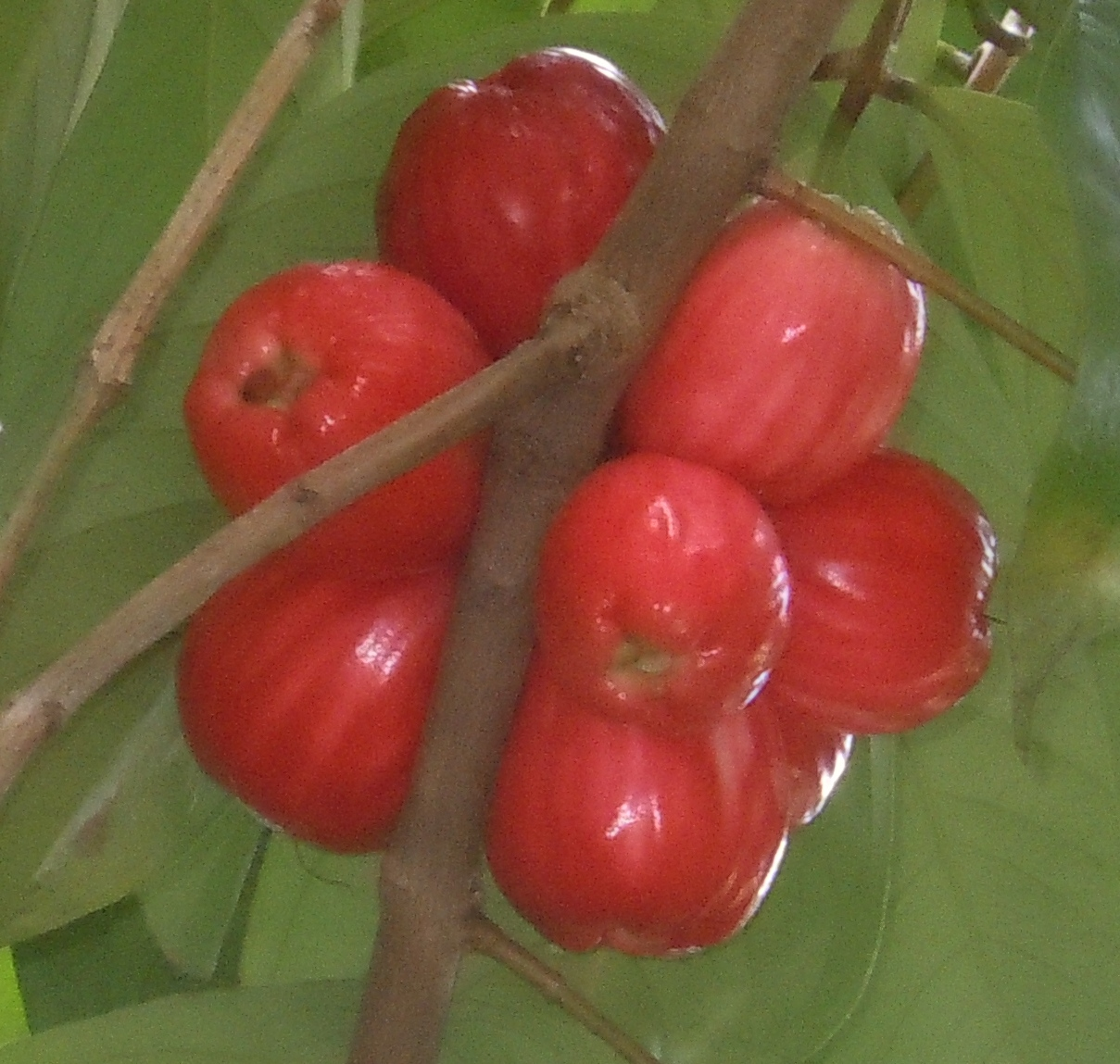
Otaheite cashew

- Australian lime — Australia
- Australian meat pie — Australia
- Devon — Australian sausage, perhaps named after Devon, Tasmania
- Melanesian papeda — citrus fruit from Melanesia
- New Zealand meat pie — New Zealand
- New Zealand rock oyster
- New Zealand spinach
- Otaheite cashew — the island of Tahiti, French Polynesia
- Otaheite gooseberry — Tahiti
- Sydney rock oyster — the city of Sydney, New South Wales
- Tahiti lime — the island of Tahiti, French Polynesia
- Tahitian vanilla — Tahiti

== South America ==
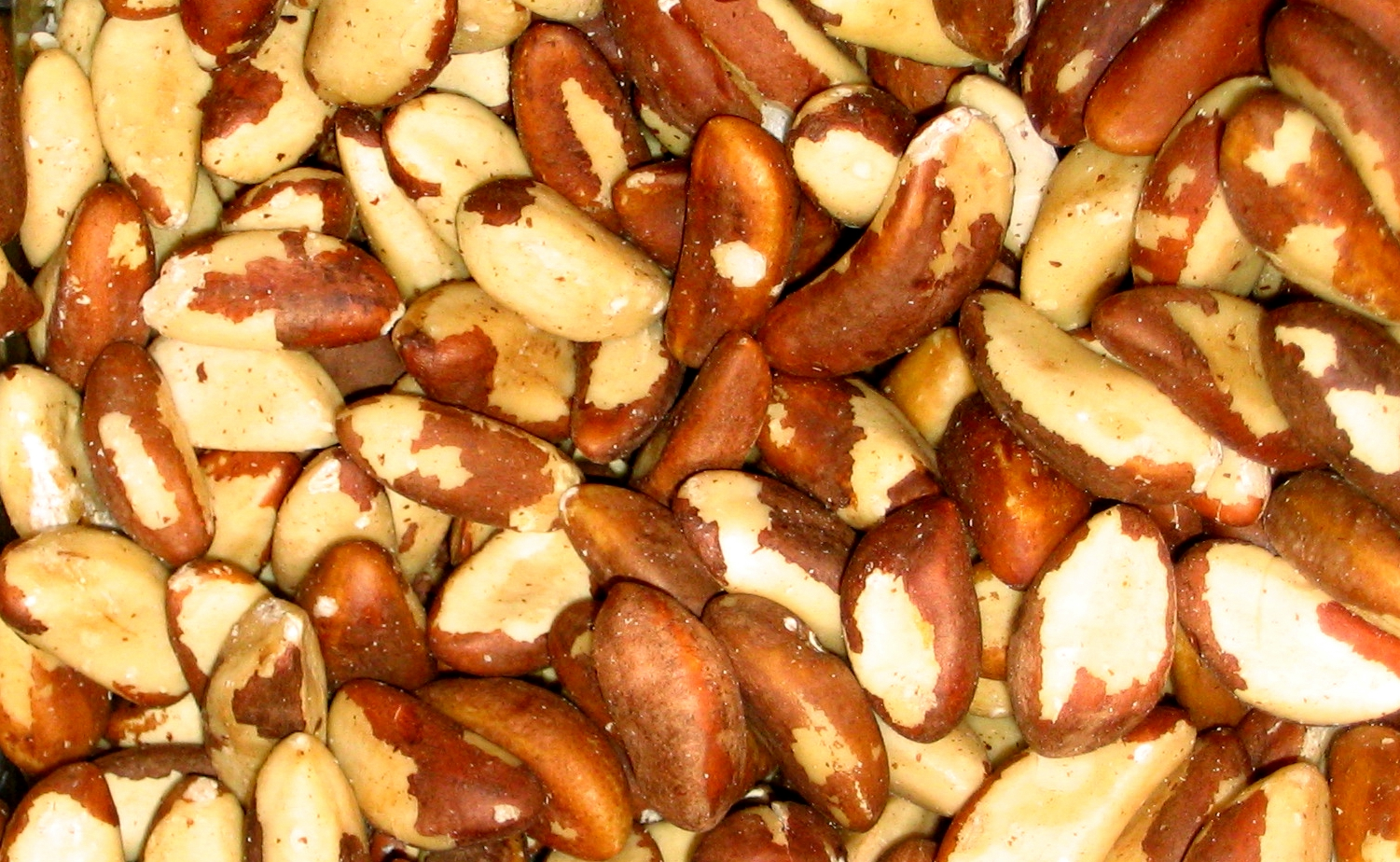
Brazil nuts

- Brazil nut — Brazil (Brazil is in turn named for the brazilwood tree, not the source of the nut)
- Butifarra Soledeñas — sausage from the city of Soledad, Atlántico, Venezuela
- Cayenne pepper — the city of Cayenne, French Guiana
- Chanco cheese — the commune of Chanco, Chile
- Chilean salad — Chile
- Chupe Andino — stew from the Andes mountains
- Demerara sugar — from the historical region of Demerara, now part of Guyana
- Guayanés cheese — the Guayana Region of Venezuela
- Guyanese pepperpot — the Guianas or Guyana
- Minas cheese — the state of Minas Gerais, Brazil
- Sopa paraguaya — corn bread from Paraguay
- Suriname cherry — Suriname
- Trinidad moruga scorpion pepper — the Moruga district of Trinidad and Tobago

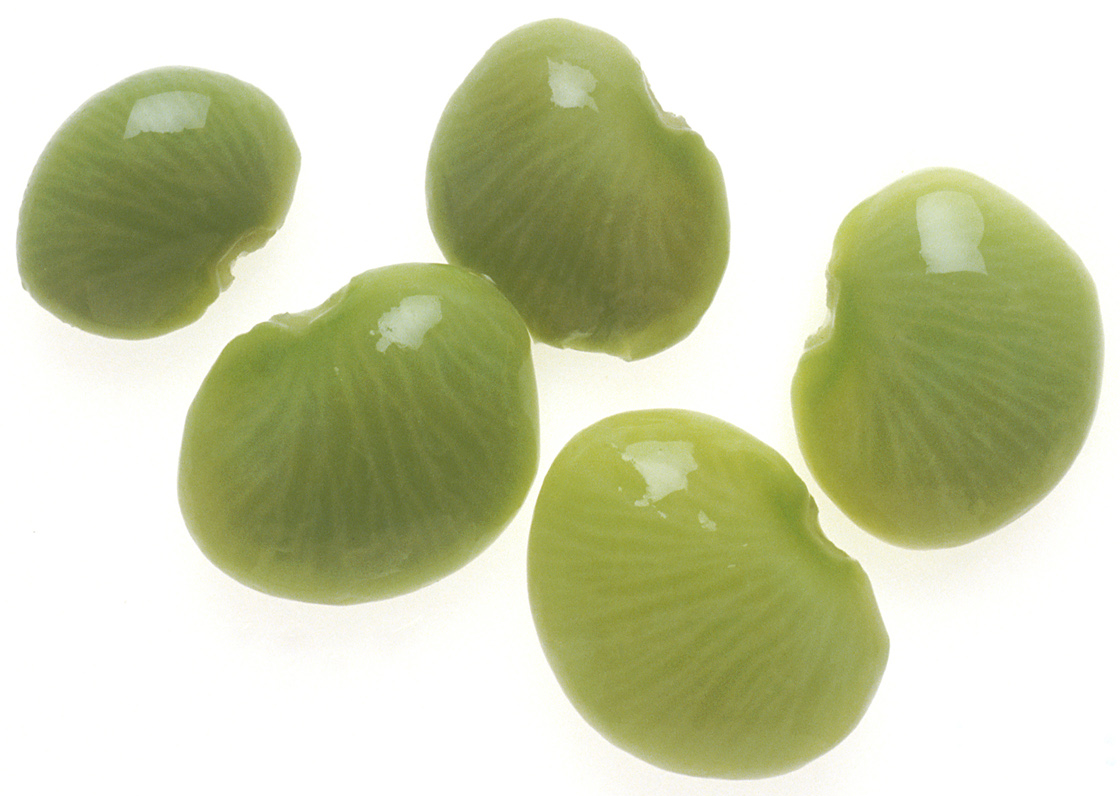
Lima beans

=== Peru ===
- Lima bean — the city of Lima
- Papa a la Huancaína — potato dish from the city, province or district of Huancayo
- Peruvian chicken
- Peruvian corn
- Peruvian pollada

== By type of food ==
=== Cheeses ===
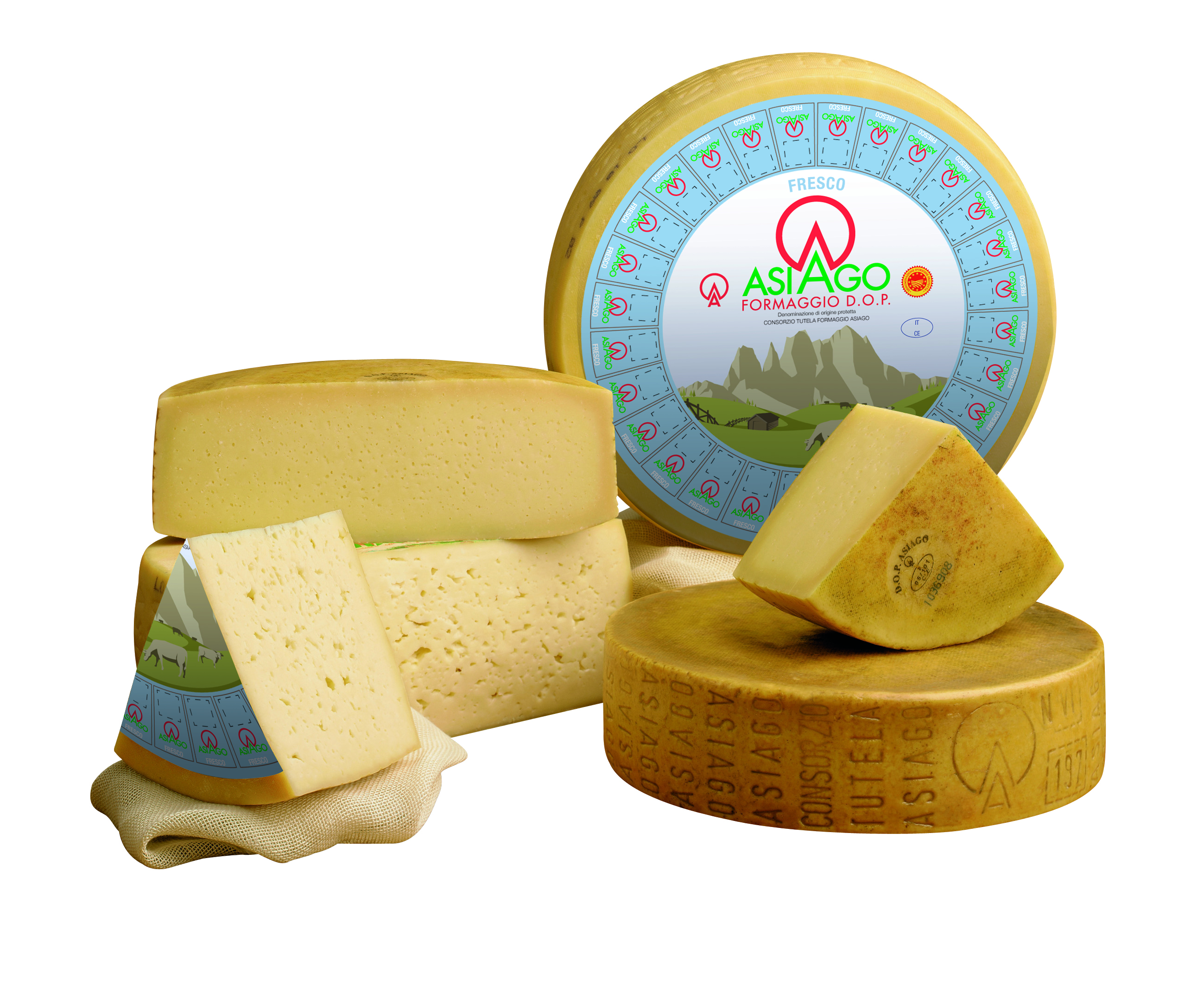
Asiago

- Abondance — the commune of Abondance, Haute-Savoie, France
- Akkawi — the city of Acre, Israel
- Alpujarra — Alpujarra region, Andalusia, Spain
- American cheese — common name for processed cheese.
- Appenzeller — the canton of Appenzell, Switzerland
- Ashdown Foresters — the Ashdown Forest heathland, East Sussex, southeast England
- Asiago — Asiago, a plateau and town in the Venetian Prealps, Italy
- Bandel — the city of Bandel, West Bengal, India
- Banon — the town of Banon, Alpes-de-Haute-Provence, France
- Bastardo del Grappa —Monte Grappa in the Venetian Prealps, Italy
- Beacon Fell Traditional Lancashire Cheese — Beacon Fell, Lancashire, England
- Beaufort — the commune of Beaufort, Savoie
- Beemster — the Beemster polder
- Beenleigh Blue — Beenleigh Manor, Harberton, Devon England
- Bergenost — the city of Bergen, Norway
- Berner Alpkäse — the Bernese Oberland region, Switzerland
- Bitto — the Bitto River in Lombardy, Italy
- Bleu d'Auvergne — the historical province of Auvergne, France

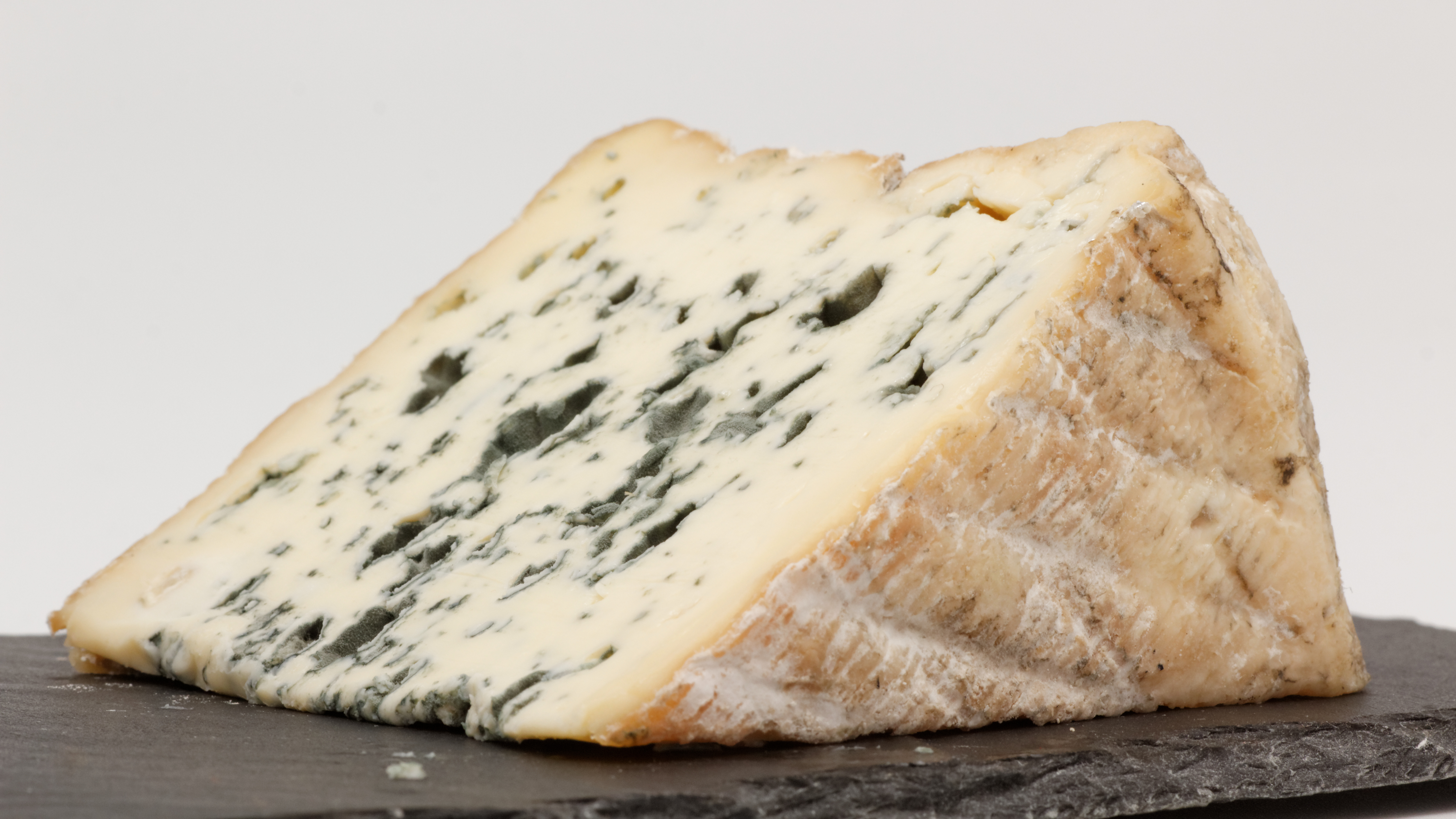
Bleu d'Auvergne

- Bleu de Gex — the eastern historical Pays de Gex, France
- Bonchester — Bonchester Bridge, south Scotland
- Bra — the town of Bra, Piedmont, Italy
- Brie — the historical Brie region near Paris, France
- Brighton Blue — the city of Brighton, East Sussex, south England
- Buxton Blue from the town of Buxton, Derbyshire, England
- Cabrales — Cabrales, a municipality in Asturias, Spain

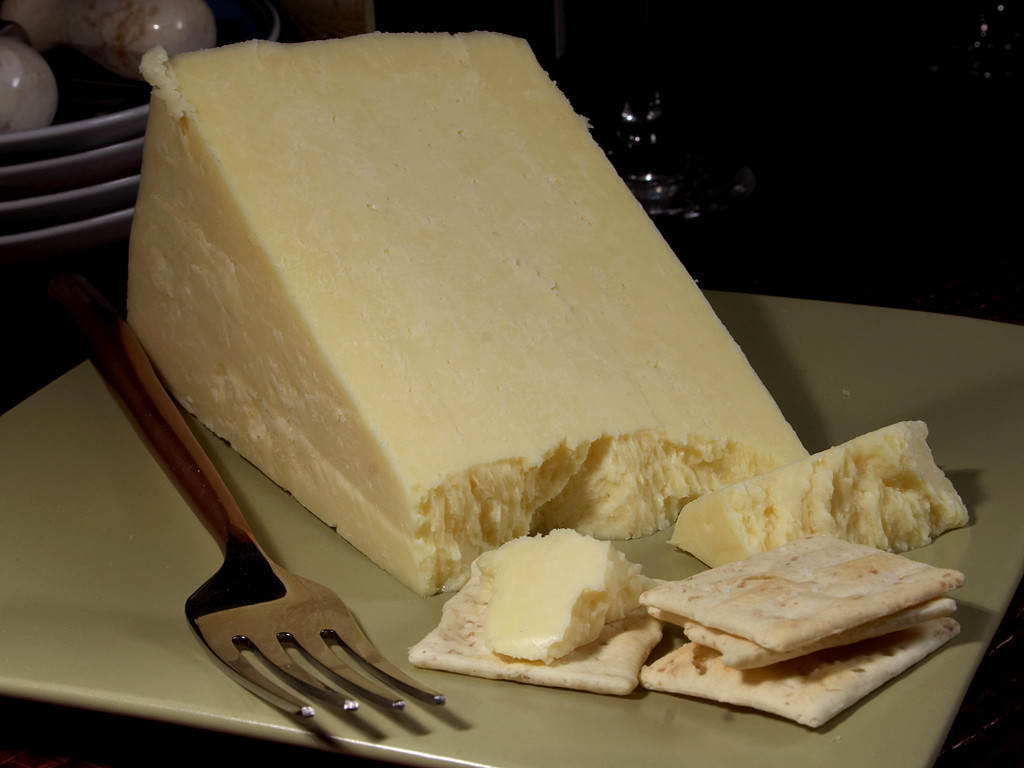
Caerphilly

- Caerphilly — Caerphilly, a town in Wales
- Camembert — the town of Camembert, Normandy, France
- Cantabrian Cream — the autonomous community of Cantabria, Spain
- Cantal — the department of Cantal, France
- Casciotta d'Urbino — the city of Urbino, Marche, Italy
- Casín — Caso, a municipality in Asturias, Spain
- Castelmagno — the municipality of Castelmagno, Piedmont, Italy
- Castelo Branco — the city of Castelo Branco, Portugal

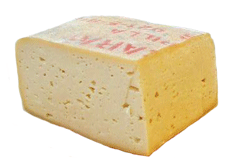
Chanco

- Chanco — the commune of Chanco, Chile
- Chaource — the village of Chaource, Champagne, France
- Cheddar — the village of Cheddar, Somerset, England
- Cherni Vit — the village of Cherni Vit, Bulgaria
- Cheshire — Cheshire county, England
- Circassian — the historical region of Circassia now in Southern Russia

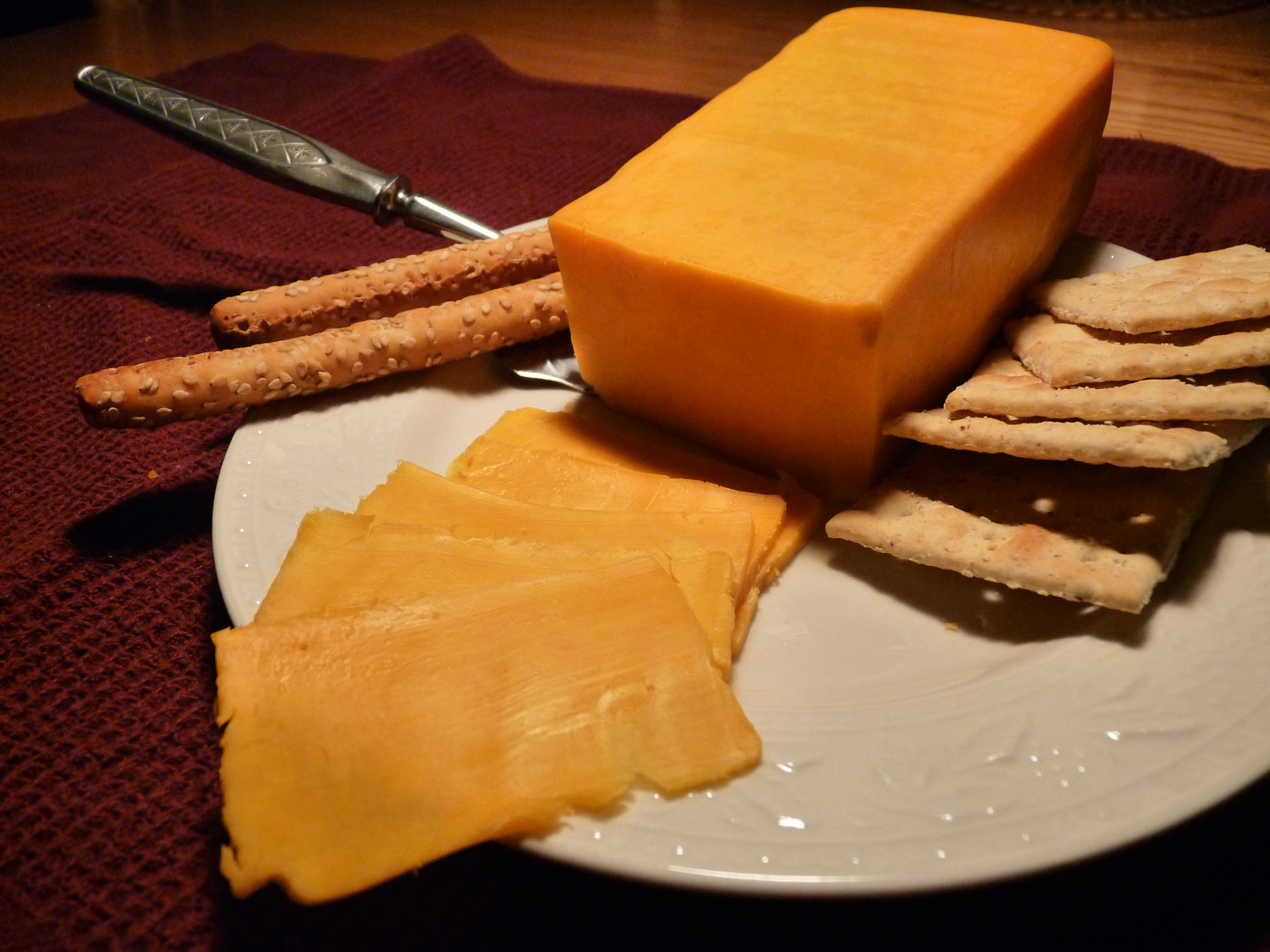
Colby

- Colby — the town of Colby, Wisconsin
- Coleraine — the town of Coleraine, Northern Ireland
- Comté — the eastern Franche-Comté region, France
- Coquetdale cheese — the valley of the River Coquet, Northumberland, England
- Cornish Blue, Cornish Brie and Cornish Yarg — cheeses from Cornwall, England
- Cotija — the town of Cotija de la Paz, Mexico
- Cotswold cheese — the Cotswolds area, England
- Crottin de Chavignol — the village of Chavignol, France
- Cuba cheese — the town of Cuba, New York
- Danbo cheese — Denmark

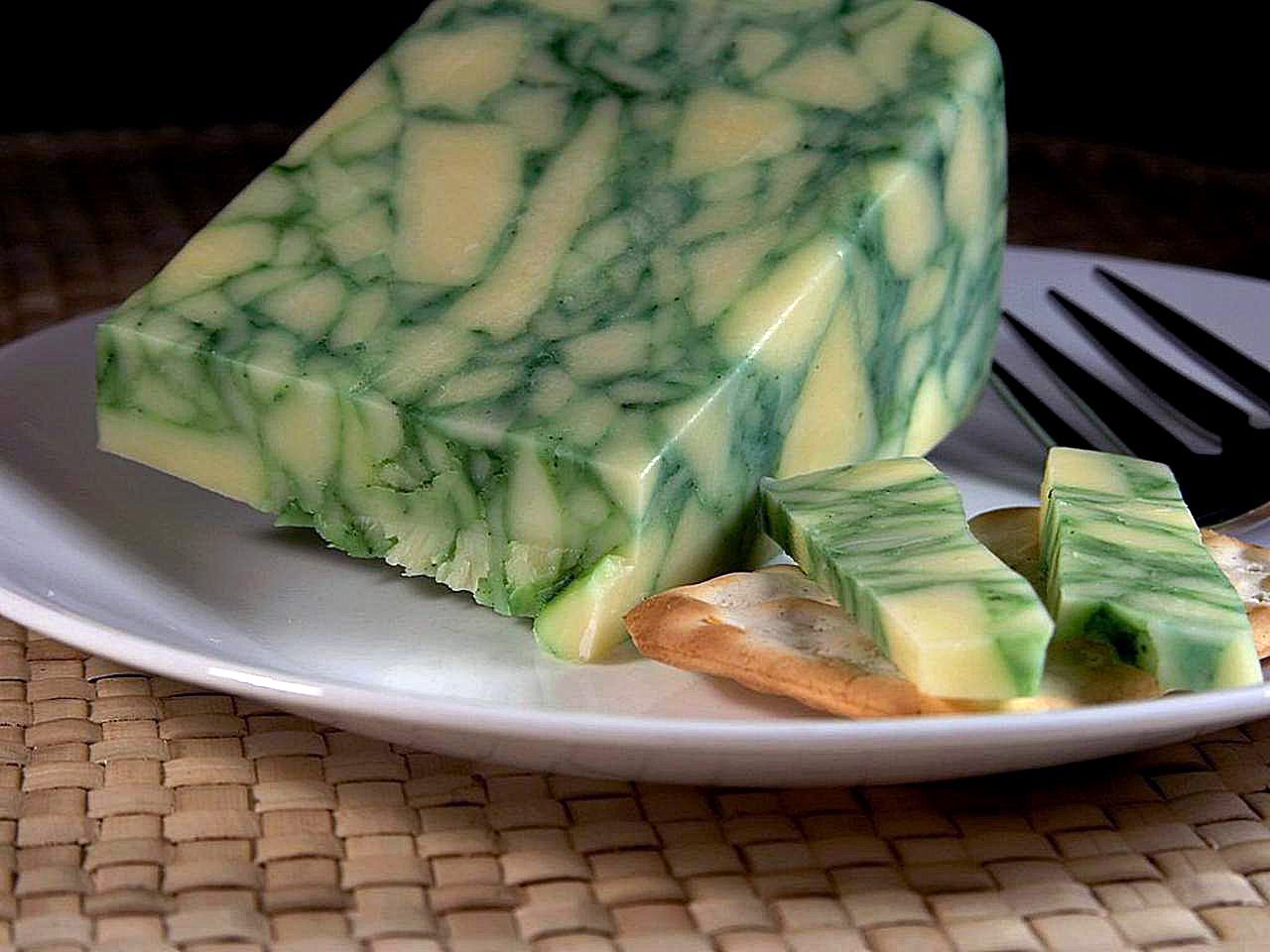
Sage derby

- Derby, Little Derby and Sage Derby — Derbyshire county, central England
- Dorset Blue Vinney — Dorset county, south England
- Dovedale — the valley of the River Dove, Central England
- Dubliner— the city of Dublin, Ireland
- Dunlop — the town of Dunlop, East Ayrshire, southwest Scotland

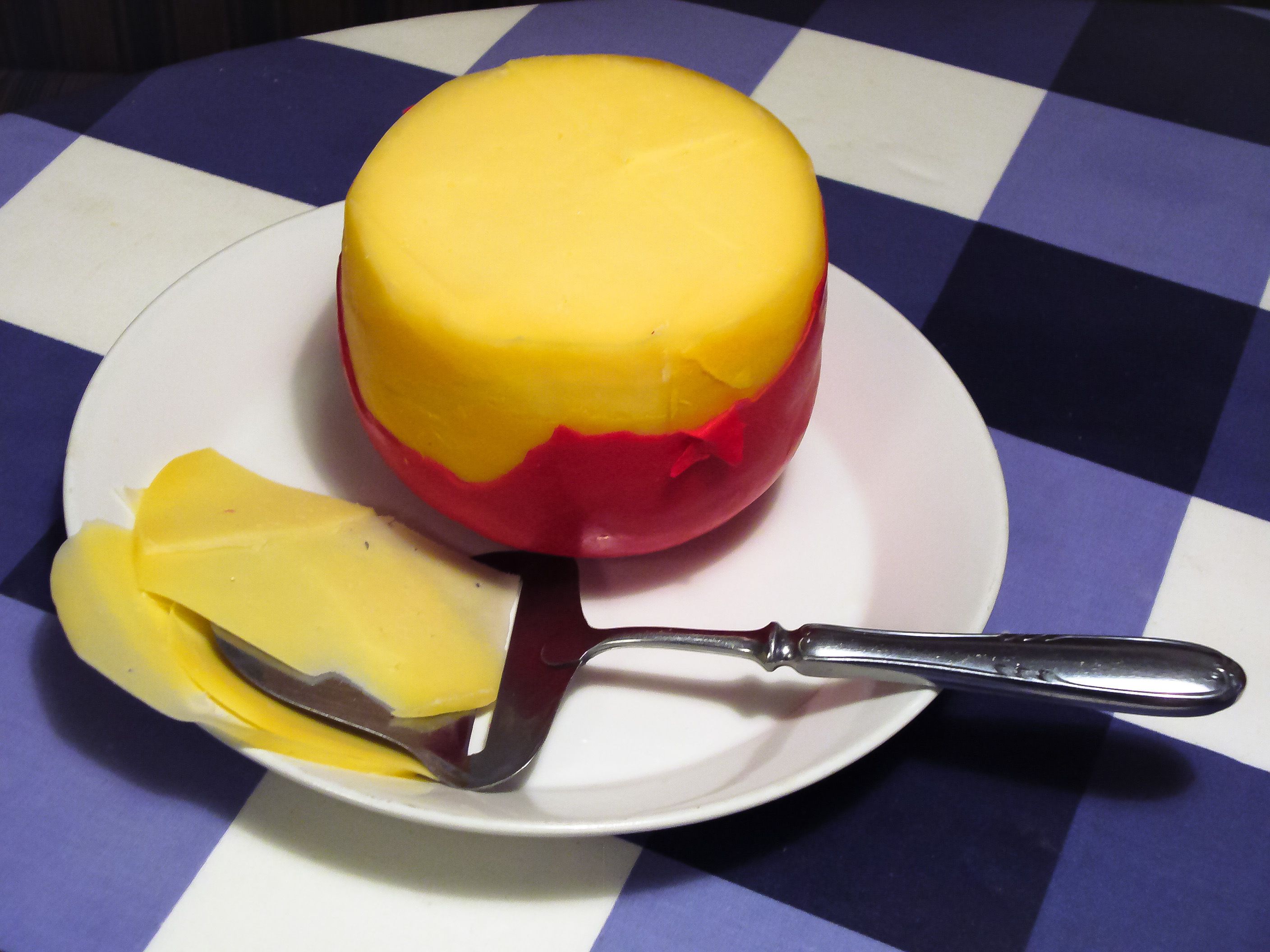
Edam

- Edam — the city of Edam, Netherlands
- Emmental — the valley of the river Emme, canton of Bern, Switzerland
- Époisses — the village of Époisses, France
- Flor de Guía — Santa María de Guía, Canary Islands
- Fourme de Montbrison — the town of Montbrison, Loire, France
- Friesian Clove — the province of Friesland, Netherlands
- Fynbo — the island of Fyn, Denmark

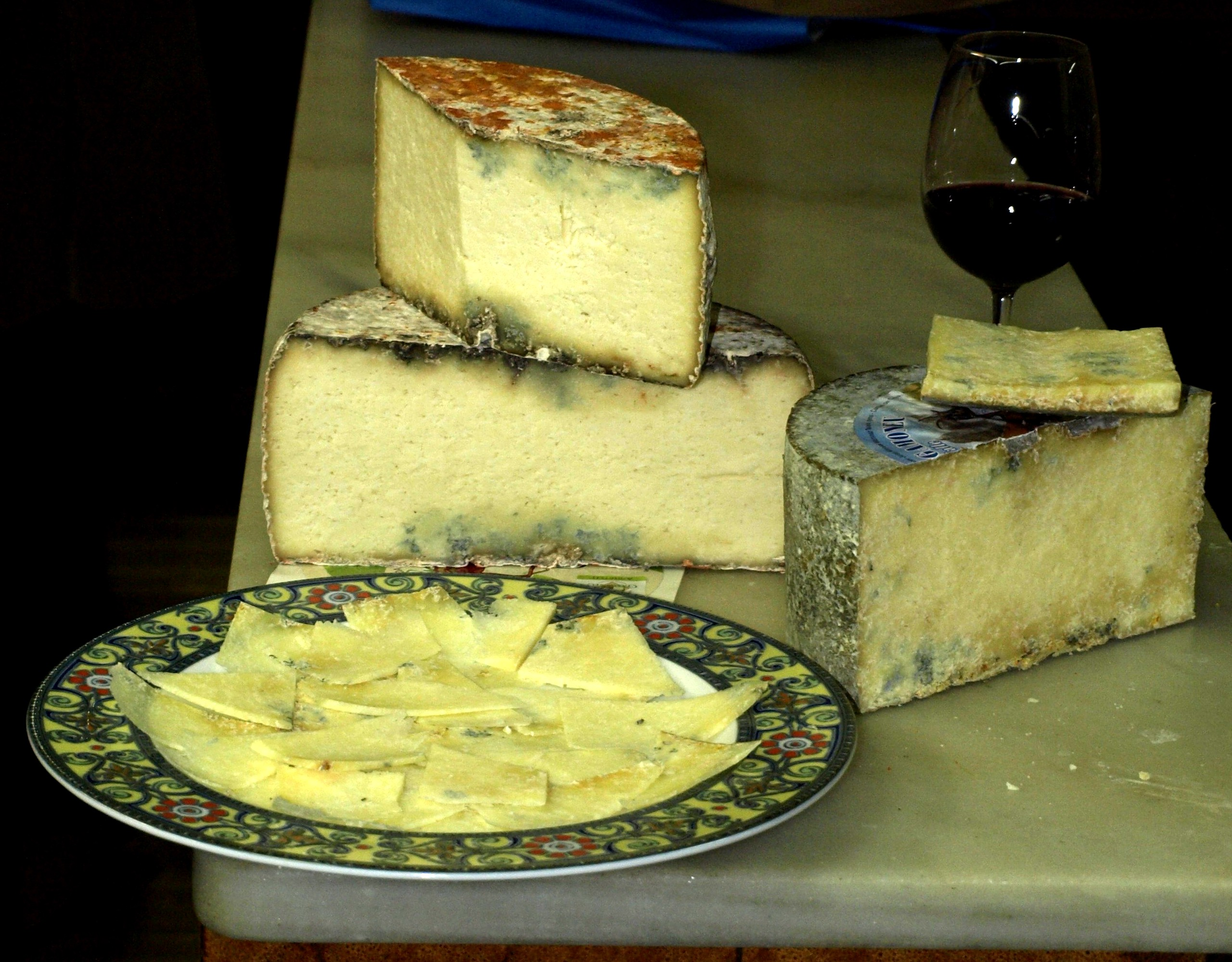
Gamonéu

- Gamonéu — small town in Onís, Asturias, Spain
- Garrotxa — Garrotxa county, Catalonia, Spain
- Gloucester and Double Gloucester — the city of Gloucester, England
- Gorgonzola — the town of Gorgonzola, Milan, Italy
- Gotland Blue — the island province of Gotland, Sweden
- Gouda — the city of Gouda, Netherlands
- Grana Padano — the Po Valley (Pianura Padana), Italy
- Graviera — the region of Agrafa on Crete, Greece
- Gruyère — the town of Gruyères, Fribourg, Switzerland
- Guayanés — the Guayana Region of Venezuela
- Gudbrandsdalsost — the Gudbrand Valley in Norway

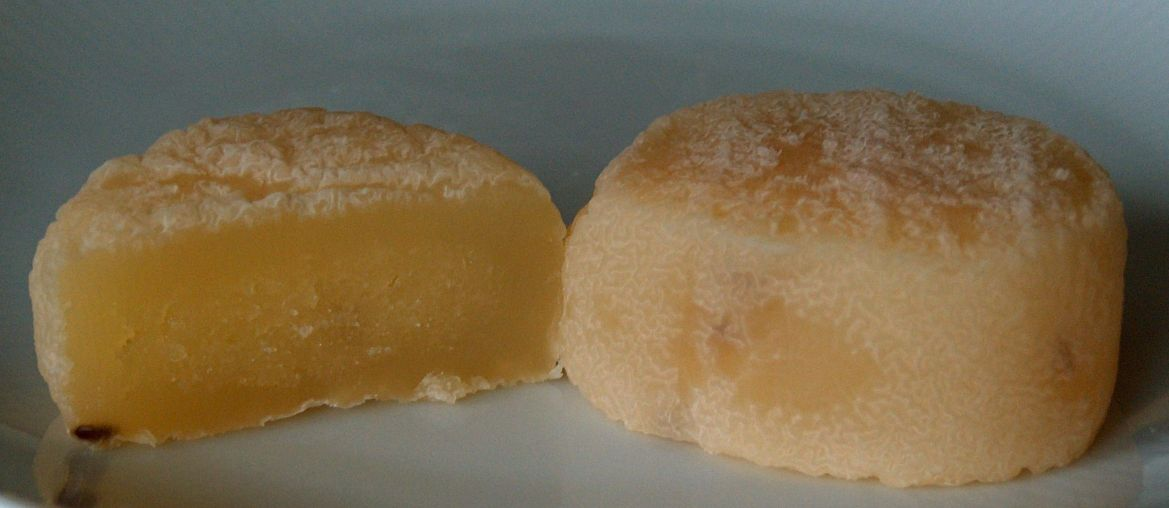
Harzer

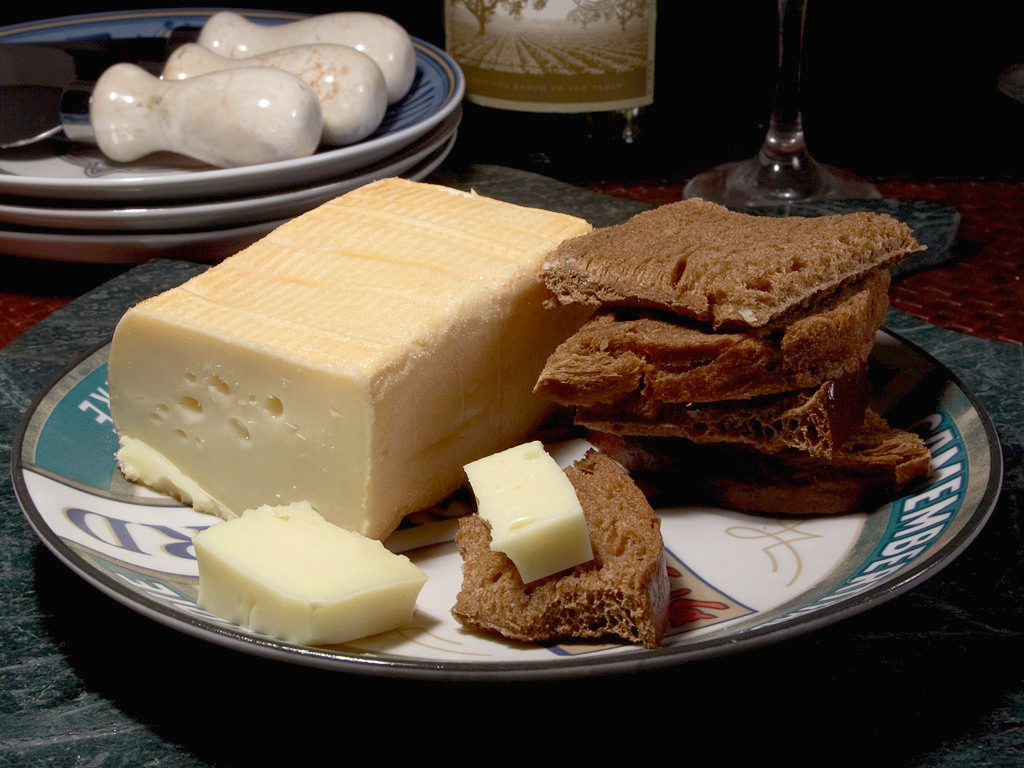
Limburger

- Harzer — the Harz mountain range in Northern Germany
- Ibores — the Ibor Valley in Extremadura, Spain
- Idiazabal — Idiazabal, small town in Basque Country, Spain
- Jarlsberg — the former county of Jarlsberg in Norway
- Kalimpong — the hill station of Kalimpong, West Bengal, India
- Korycinski — the town of Korycin, Poland
- L'Etivaz — the hamlet of L'Etivaz, Vaud, Switzerland
- La Serena — La Serena district in Extremadura, Spain
- Laguiole — the village of Laguiole, Aveyron, France
- Lanark Blue — Lanarkshire county, Scotland
- Lancashire — Lancashire county, northwest England
- Langres — the Langres plateau, Champagne region
- Lappi — Lapland region of Finland
- Leerdammer — the city of Leerdam, Netherlands
- Leyden — the city of Leiden, Netherlands
- Lighvan — the village of Liqvan in Iran
- Limburger — Limburg, a former duchy, now mostly in Belgium
- Lincolnshire Poacher cheese — Lincolnshire county, England
- Liptauer — the historical region of Liptov in Slovakia

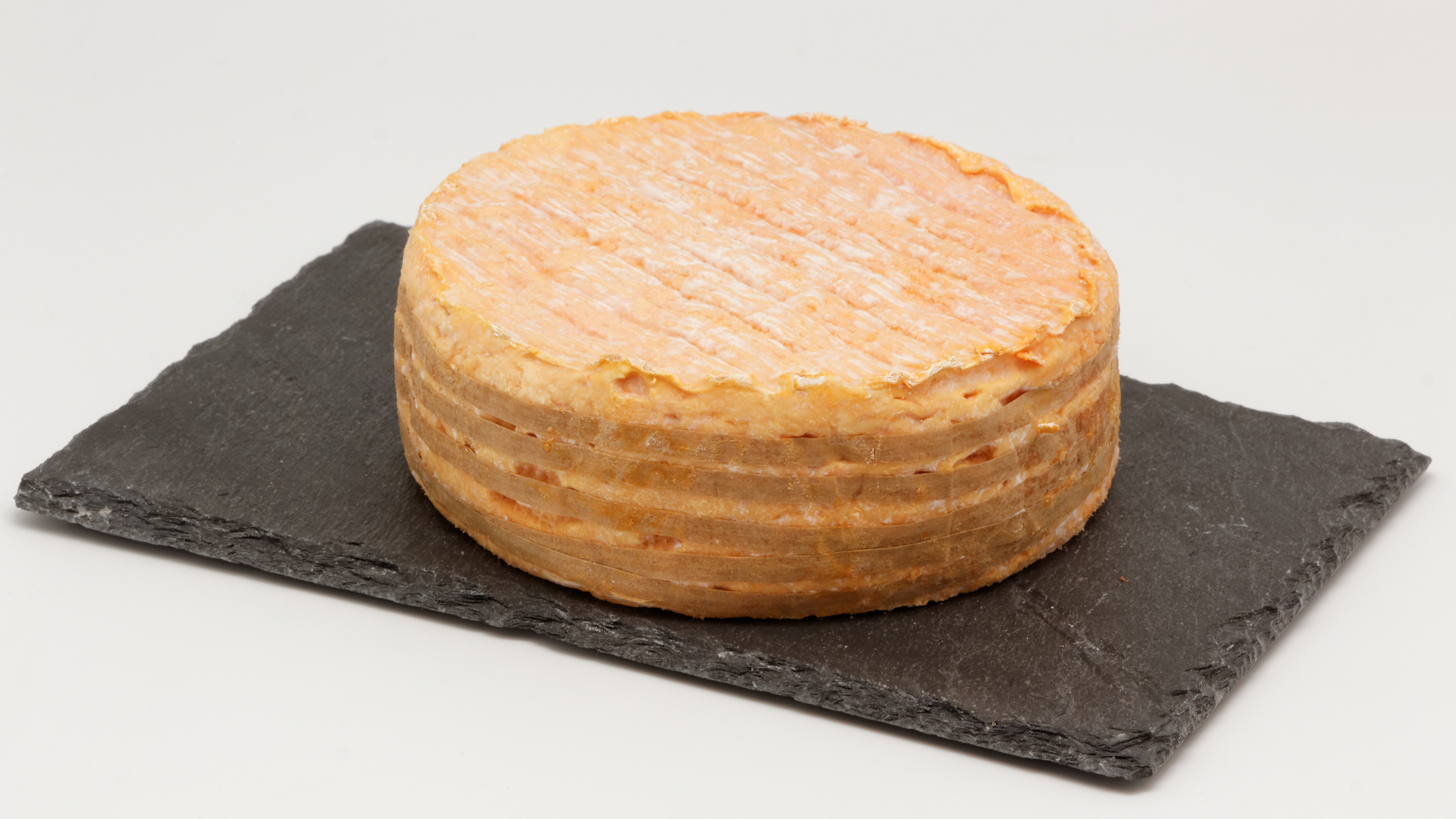
Livarot

- Livarot — the town of Livarot in Normandy
- Mâconnais — the city of Mâcon, France
- Mahón — the city of Mahón, Menorca, Spain
- Mallorca — the island of Mallorca, Spain
- Manchego — La Mancha region, Spain
- Maribo — the town of Maribo in Denmark
- Maroilles — the village of Maroilles, Nord, France
- Metsovone — the region of Metsovo in Epirus, Greece

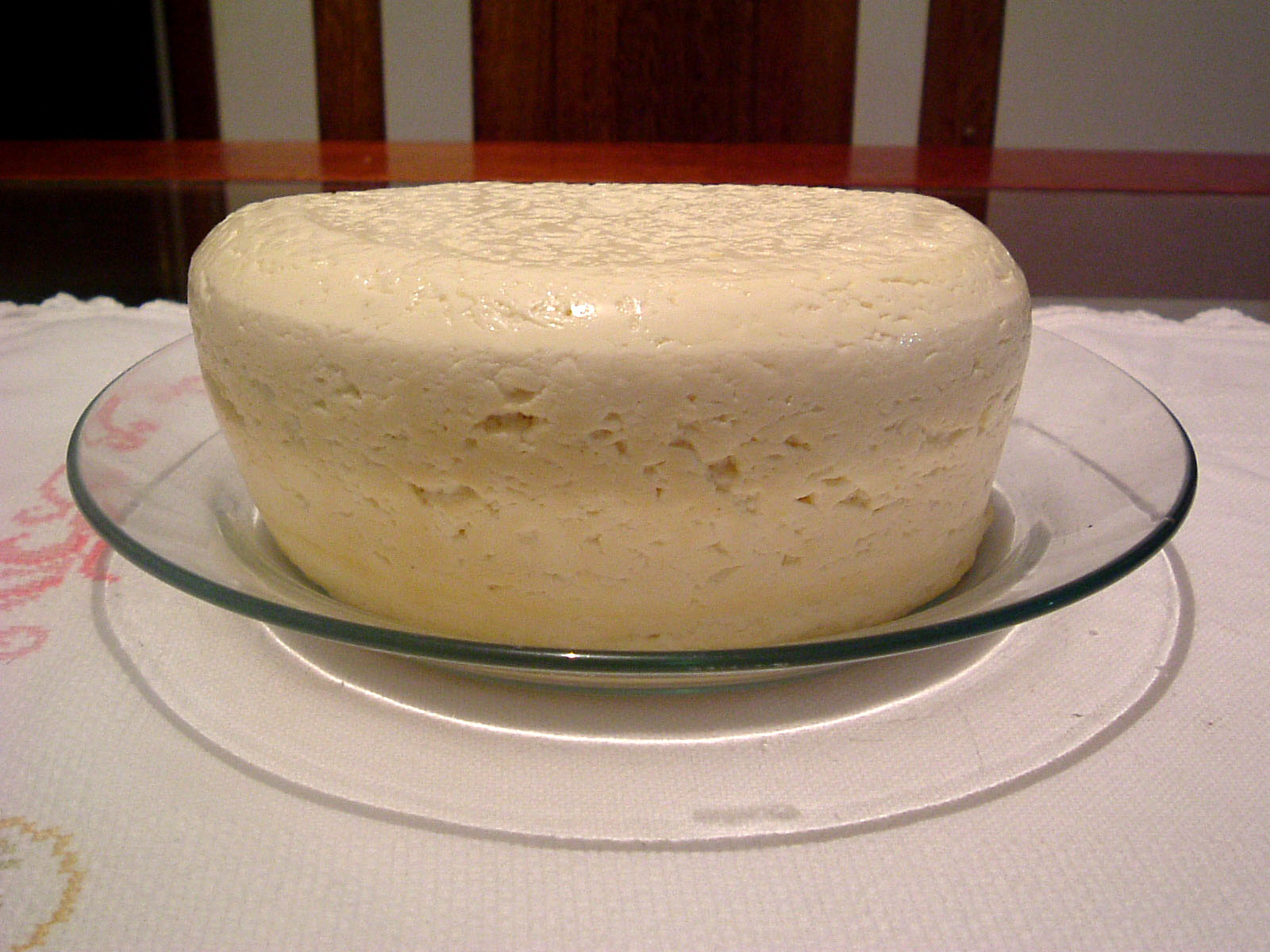
Minas

- Minas cheese — the state of Minas Gerais, Brazil
- Molbo cheese — the Mols peninsula in Jutland, Denmark
- Montasio — the mountain Jôf di Montasio in the Julian Alps, Italy
- Monte Veronese — the Province of Verona, Italy
- Monterey Jack — Monterey, California
- Morbier — the village of Morbier, Jura, France
- Morlacco — the Morlachia region, now part of Croatia
- Munster — the town Munster, Alsace, France
- Murcian and Murcian wine cheese — the Region of Murcia, Spain
- Nablusi — the city of Nablus, West Bank
- Neufchâtel — the town of Neufchâtel-en-Bray, Normandy, France
- Norbury Blue — Norbury Park, Surrey, England
- Norvegia — Norway

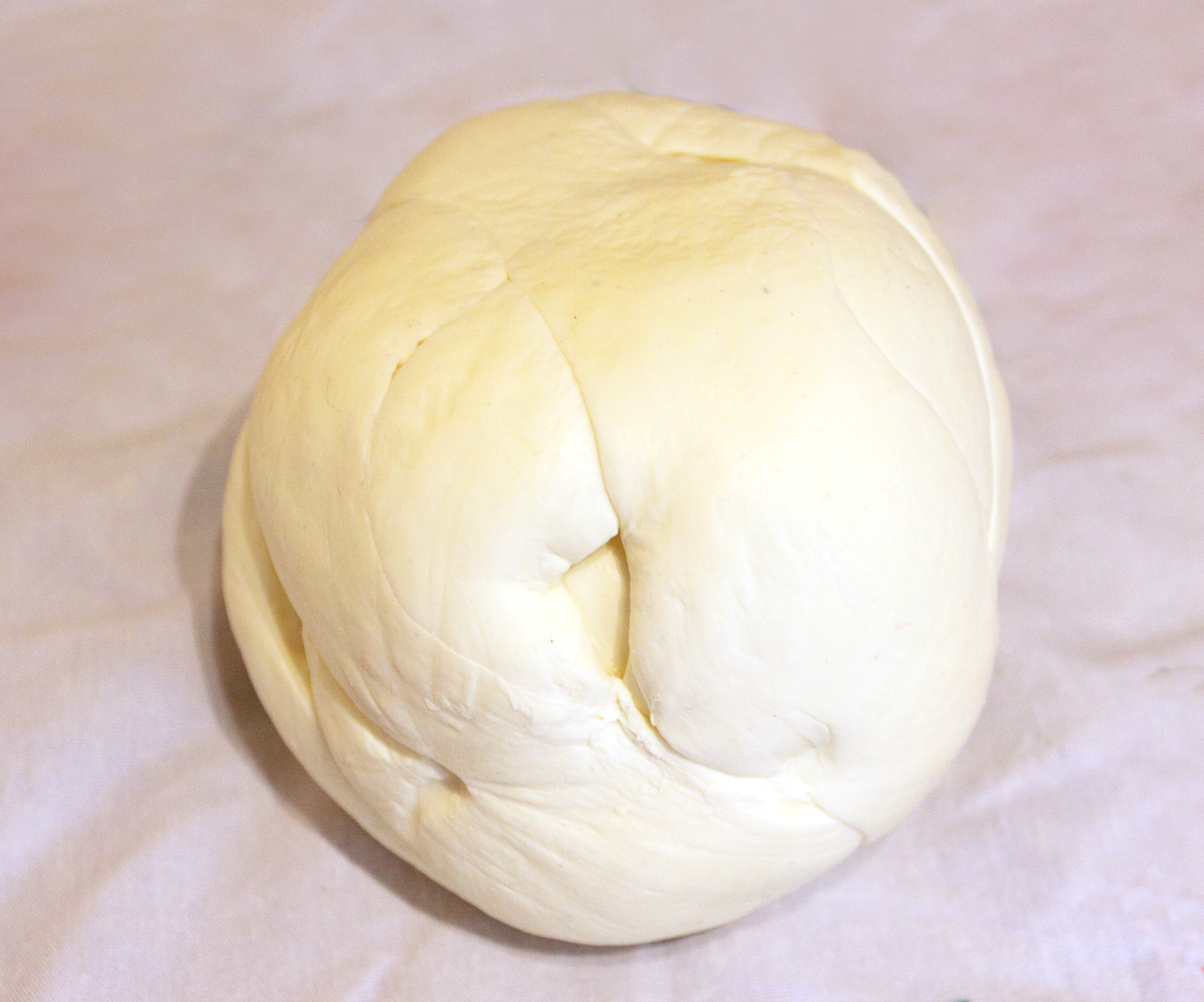
Oaxaca

- Oaxaca — Oaxaca de Juarez, a state and city in Mexico
- Oka cheese — the village of Oka, Quebec, Canada
- Olomoucké tvarůžky or Olmützer — the city of Olomouc in Moravia, Czech Republic
- Ossau-iraty — the Ossau Valley and the Irati Forest in French Basque Country
- Pag cheese — the island of Pag, Croatia
- Pallone di Gravina — the town of Gravina in Puglia, Italy
- Palmero — the island of La Palma, Canary Islands
- Parlick Fell — Parlick, a hill in Lancashire county, England

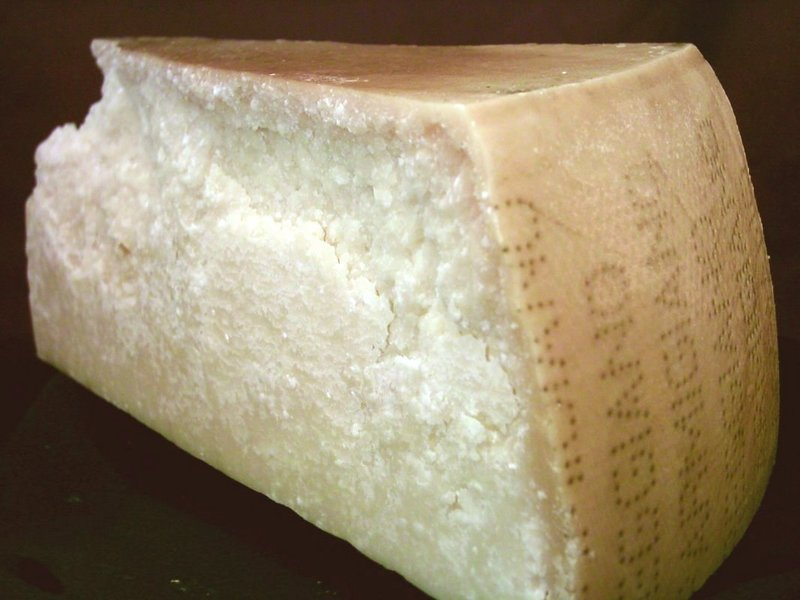
Parmesan

- Parmesan — the city or province of Parma, Italy
- Parmigiano-Reggiano — the cities of Parma and Reggio Emilia, Italy
- Passendale cheese — the village of Passendale, Belgium
- Pecorino di Filiano — the town of Filiano, Basilicata, Italy
- Pecorino Romano — the city of Rome, Italy
- Pecorino Sardo — the island of Sardinia, Italy
- Pecorino Siciliano — the island of Sicily, Italy
- Pecorino Toscano — the region of Tuscany, Italy
- Penteleu— the Penteleu mountains, Romania
- Piave — the Piave river, Veneto, Italy
- Picón Bejes-Tresviso — the small town of Tresviso, Cantabria, Spain
- Pinconning cheese — the city of Pinconning, Michigan

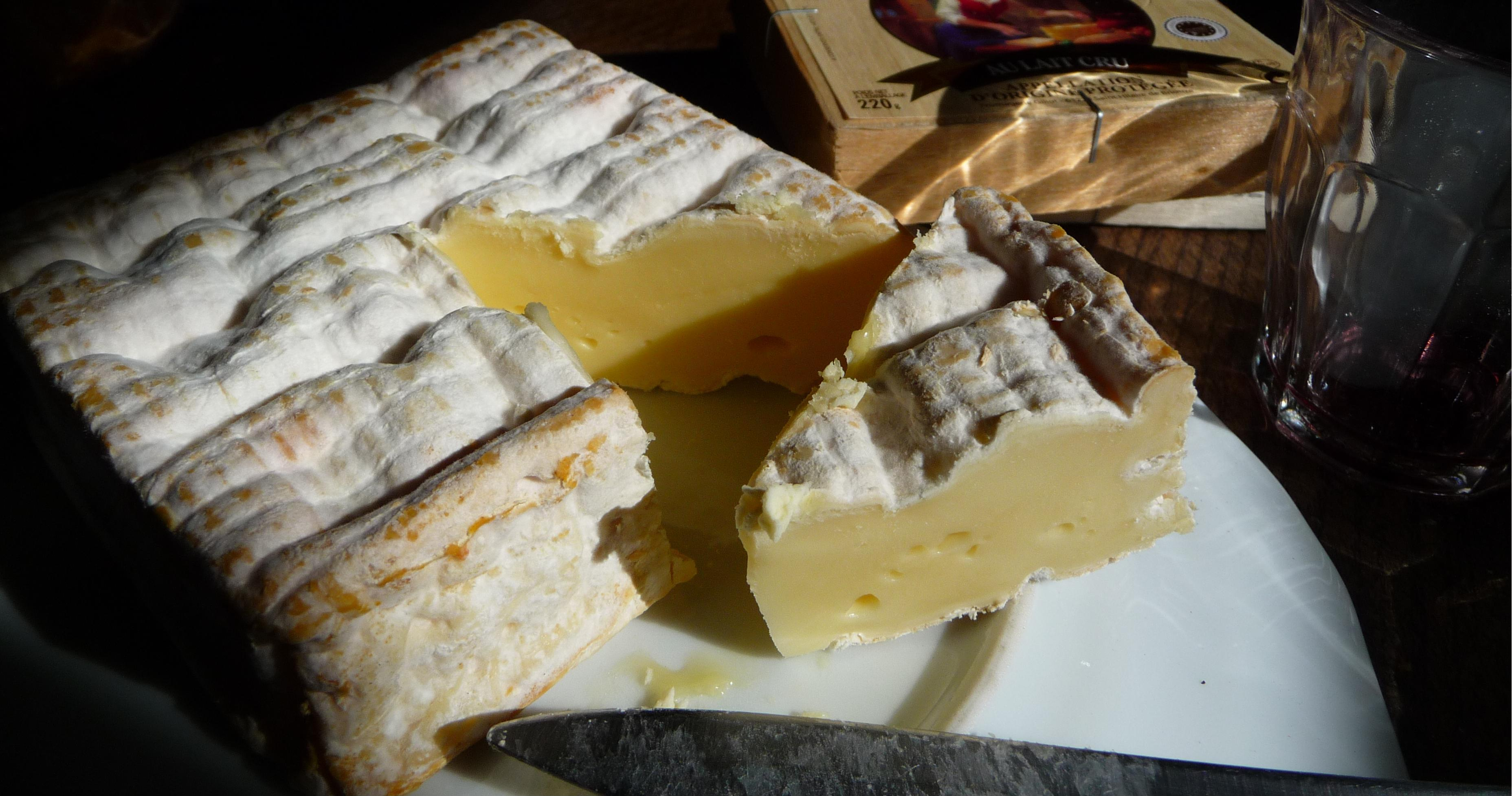
Pont-l'Évêque

- Pont-l'Évêque — the town of Pont-l'Évêque, Calvados France
- Pouligny-Saint-Pierre — the commune of Pouligny-Saint-Pierre, Indre, France
- Queijo de Nisa — the municipality of Nisa, Portugal
- Queijo do Pico — Pico Island in the Azores
- Queso Chihuahua — the state of Chihuahua in Mexico
- Ragusano — the Province of Ragusa, Sicily, Italy

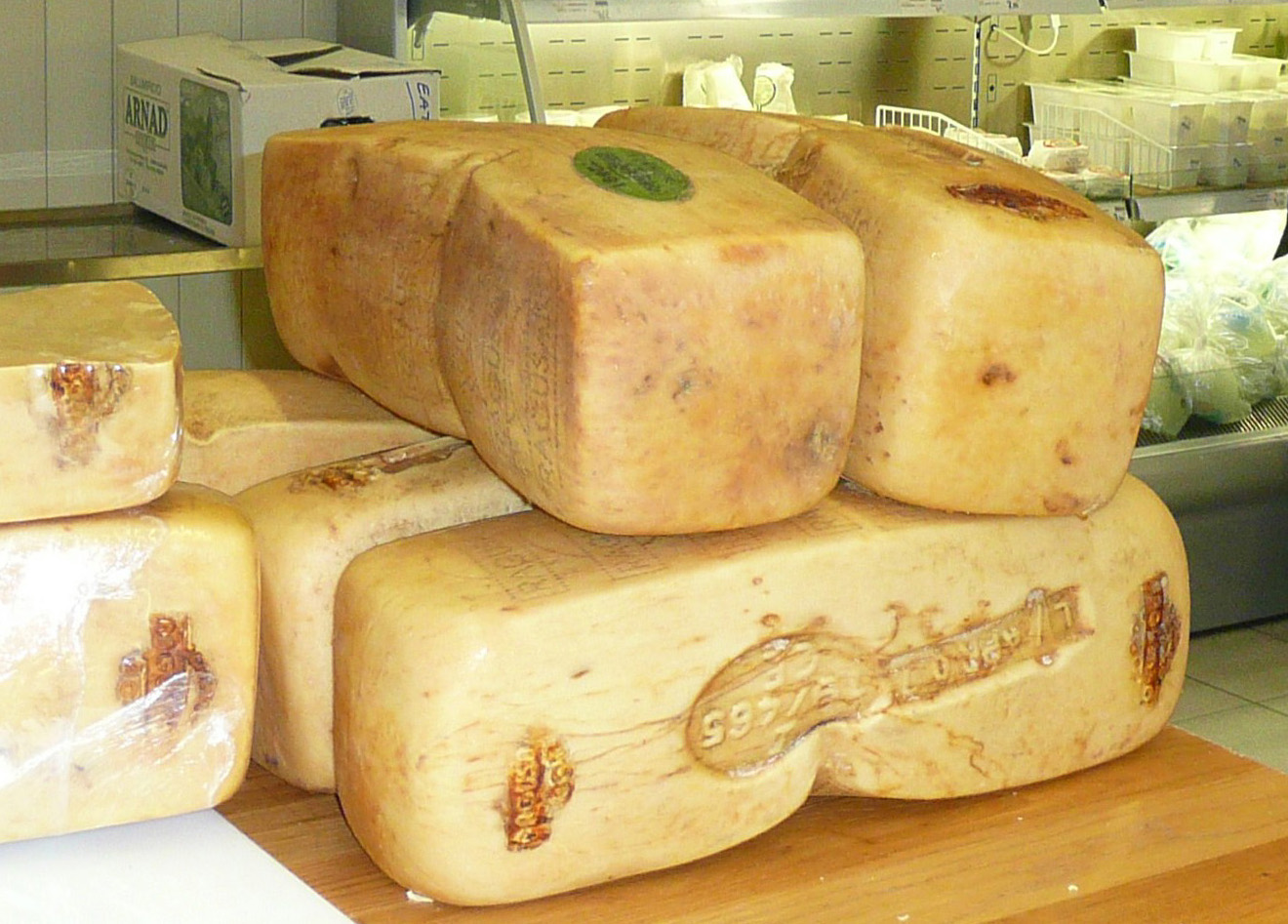
Ragusano

- Red Leicester — the city of Leicester in central England
- Red Windsor — the town of Windsor, Berkshire, England
- Rigotte de Condrieu — the town of Condrieu, Rhône, France
- Robiola, possibly named after the town of Robbio, Lombardy, Italy
- Rocamadour — the village of Rocamadour, Lot, France
- Romano cheese — the city of Rome
- Roncal — the Roncal Valley in Navarre, Spain
- Roquefort — the village of Roquefort-sur-Soulzon, Aveyron, France
- Rosa Camuna — the Val Camonica, Lombardy, Italy
- Sainte-Maure de Touraine — the town of Sainte-Maure-de-Touraine, Indre-et-Loire, France

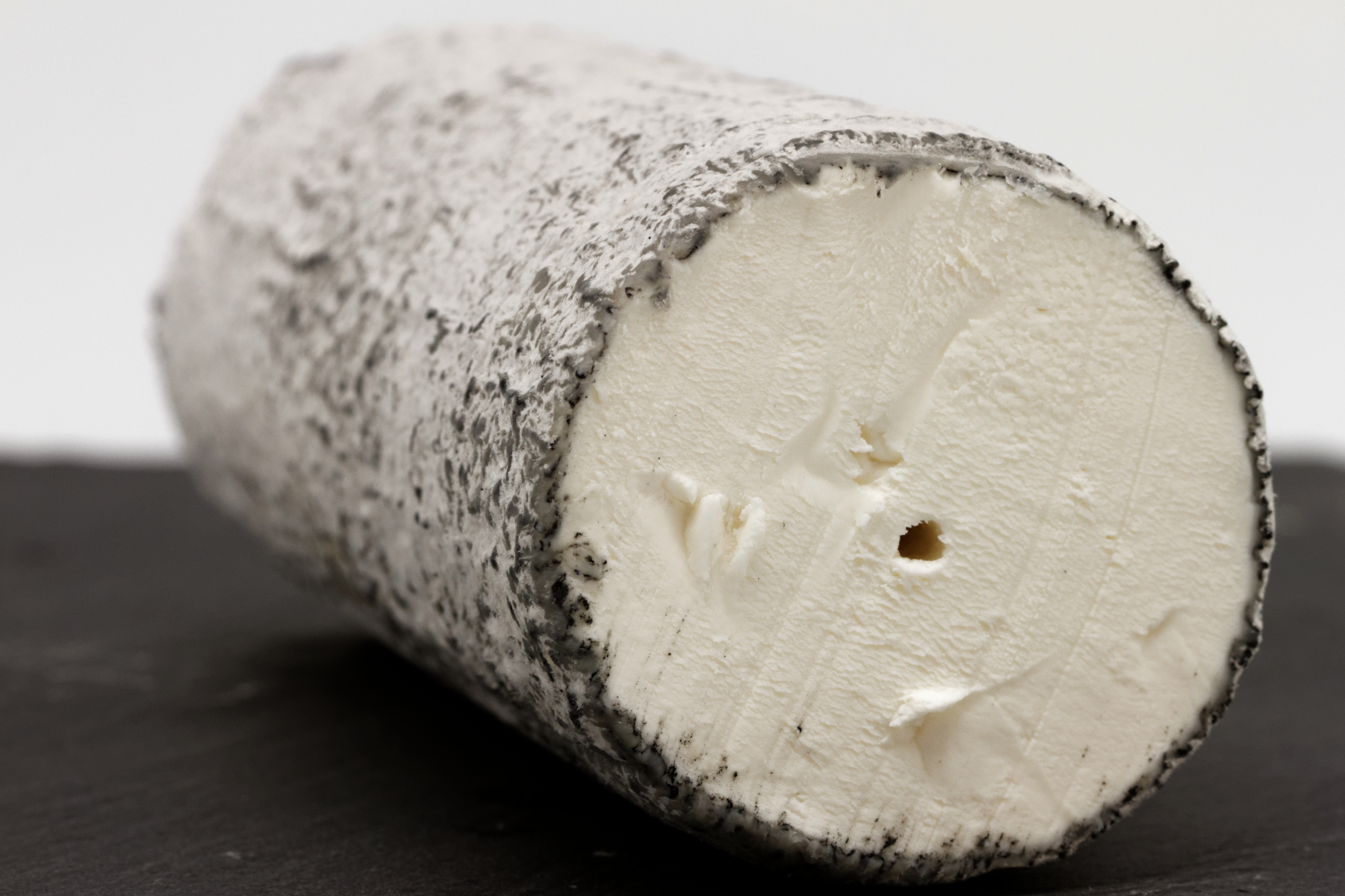
Sainte-Maure de Touraine

- Samsø — the island of Samsø, Denmark
- Santarém — the Santarém District, Portugal
- São Jorge — São Jorge Island in the Azores
- Selles-sur-Cher — the town of Selles-sur-Cher, Loir-et-Cher, France
- Serra da Estrela — the Serra da Estrela mountain range, Portugal
- Shropshire Blue — Shropshire county, west England
- Stilton and Stichelton — the village of Stilton, Cambridgeshire, England
- Sussex Slipcote — the historic county of Sussex, south England
- Svecia — Sweden

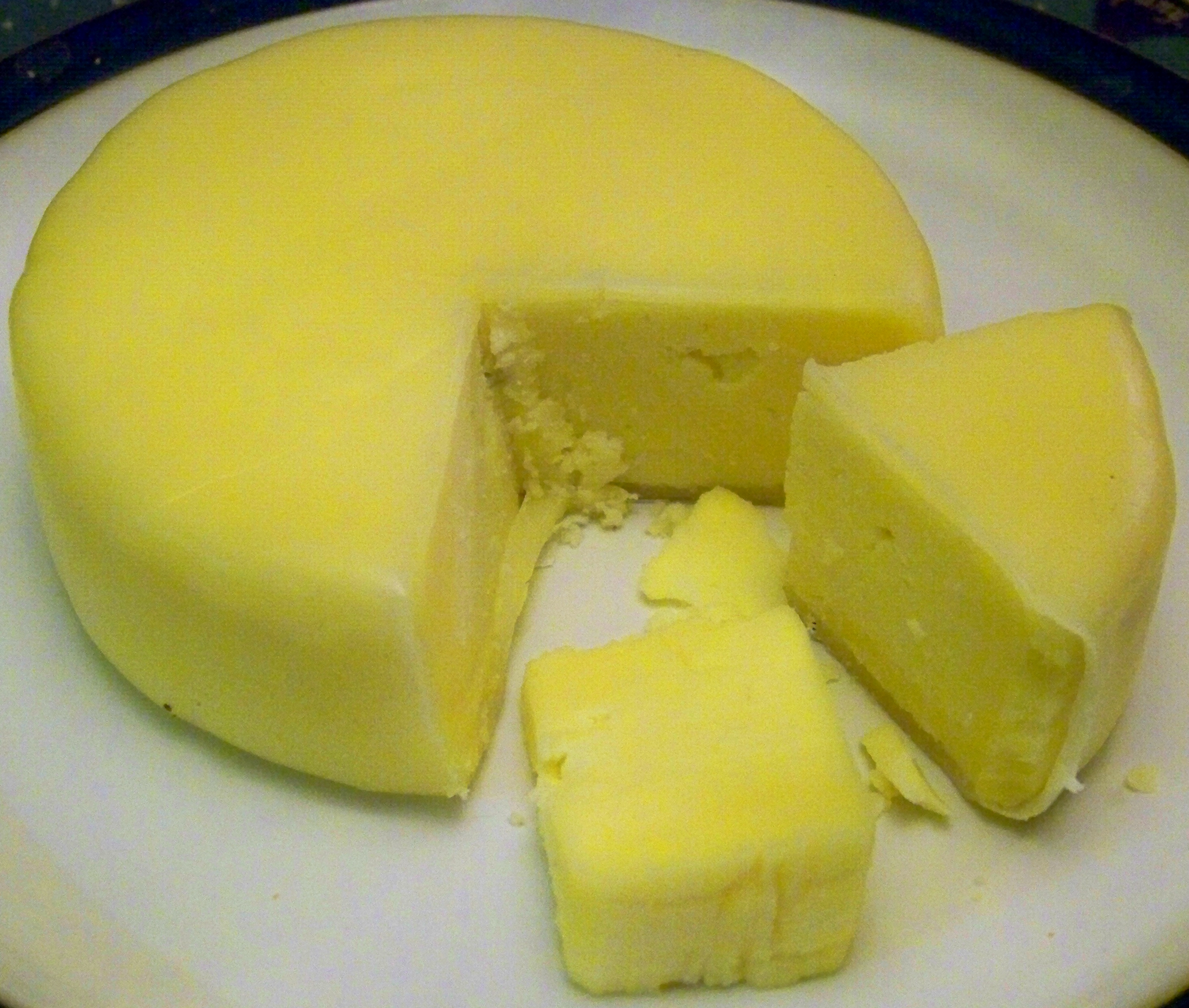
Swaledale

- Swaledale — Swaledale, a valley in North Yorkshire, England
- Swiss cheese — generic name in North America for several related varieties of cheese which resemble the Swiss Emmental
- Taleggio — Val Taleggio, Lombardy, Italy
- Teviotdale — the valley of the River Teviot, Roxburghshire, south Scotland
- Tilsit — the town of Tilsit in East Prussia (now Sovetsk, Russia)
- Tintern — the village of Tintern, southeast Wales
- Tomme de Savoie — the historic region of Savoy, France
- Tomme Vaudoise — the canton of Vaud, Switzerland

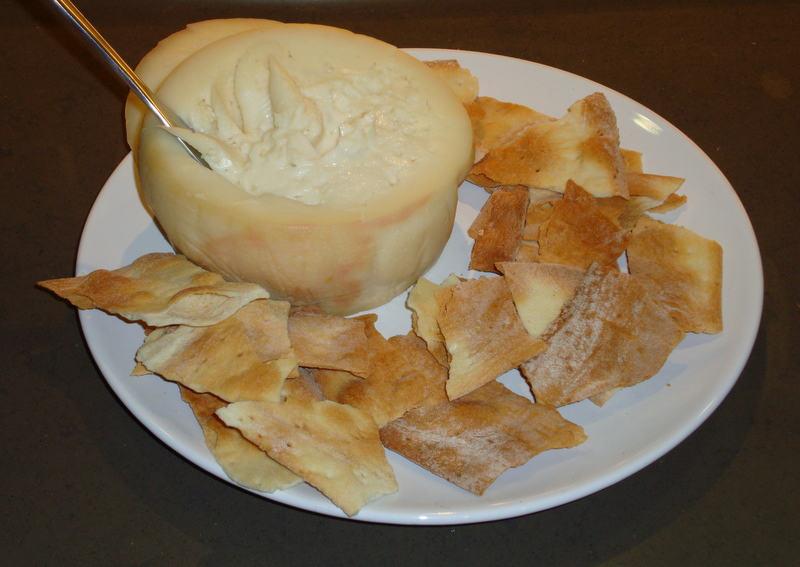
Torta del Casar

- Torta del Casar — Casar de Cáceres, a municipality in Extremadura, Spain
- Tzfatit — the city of Safed, Israel
- Vacherin Fribourgeois — the canton of Fribourg, Switzerland
- Valdeón — Posada de Valdeón, a municipality in Castile and León, Spain
- Valençay — the town of Valençay, Indre France
- Valle d'Aosta Fromadzo — the Aosta Valley region
- Valtellina Casera — the Valtellina valley in Lombardy, Italy

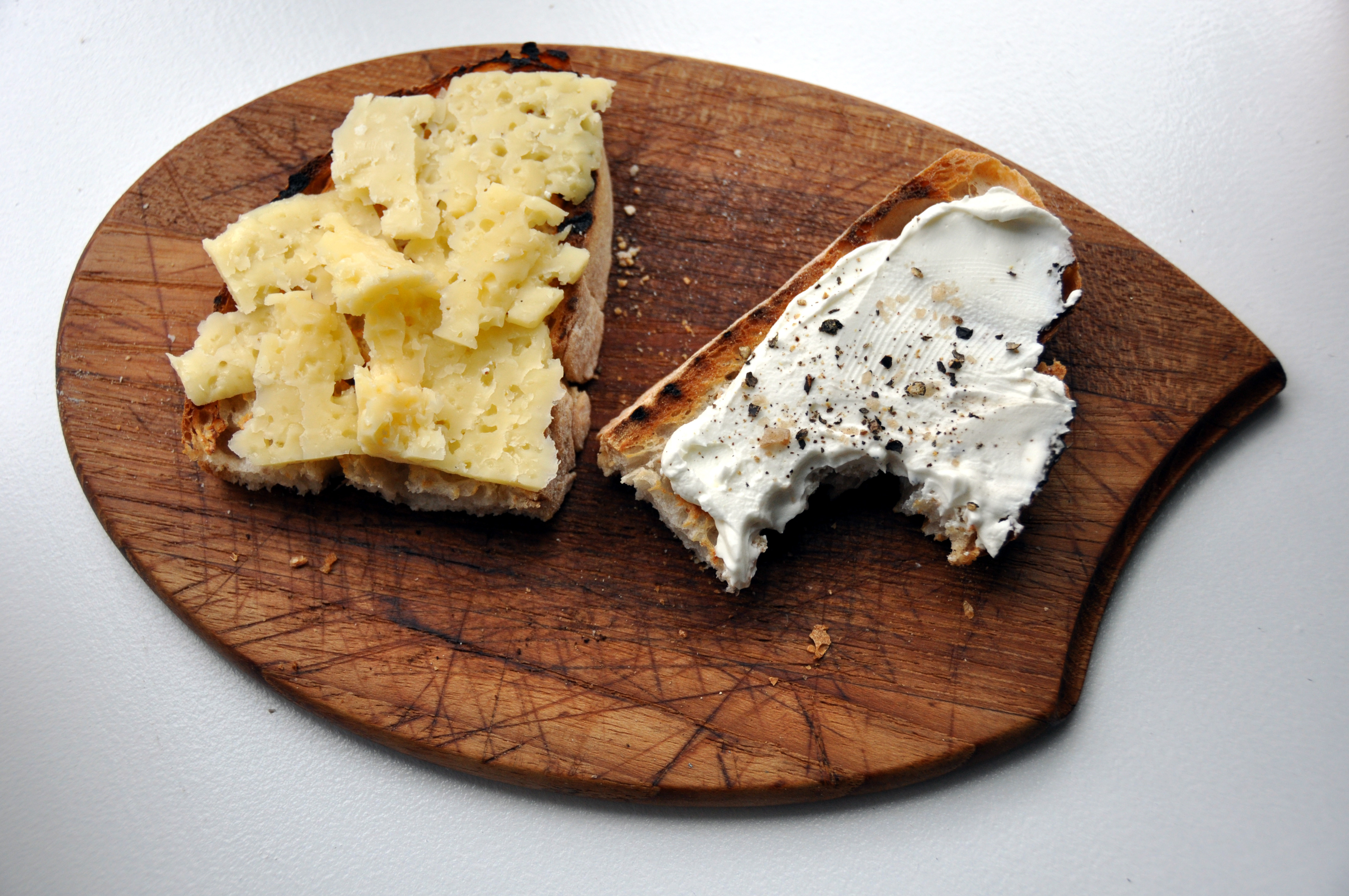
Bread with Västerbotten and goat cheese

- Västerbotten cheese — the Västerbotten (West Botnia) province, Sweden
- Waterloo — the town of Waterloo, Belgium
- Wensleydale — Wensleydale in North Yorkshire, England
- Y Fenni — the Welsh name of Abergavenny, southeast Wales
- Zamorano — the Province of Zamora, Spain

== See also ==
- List of drinks named after places
- List of words derived from toponyms
- List of foods named after people
