= Olszynka (disambiguation) =

Olszynka is a district of Gdańsk, Poland.

Olszynka may also refer to the following places:

- Olszynka, Podlaskie Voivodeship (north-east Poland)
- Olszynka, West Pomeranian Voivodeship (north-west Poland)
- Olszynka, Opole Voivodeship (south-west Poland)
- Olszynka, Warmian-Masurian Voivodeship (north Poland)
