= Szumowski =

Szumowski, feminine: Szumowska is a Polish toponymic surname derived from any of places named Szumowo or Szumów. The Russian-language equivalent is Shumovsky/Shumovskaya. Notable people with the surname include:

- Antoinette Szumowska (1868−1938), Polish pianist and piano teacher
- Łukasz Szumowski (born 1972), Polish cardiologist, former minister of health
- Małgorzata Szumowska (born 1973), Polish film director, screenwriter and producer
- Tadeusz Szumowski (botn 1951), Polish historian and diplomat

== See also ==
- Szumski
