= Shumskyi =

Shumskyi, feminine: Shumska is a Ukrainian surname. Polish equivalent:Szumski/Szumska, Russian:Shumsky/Shumskaay. Notable people with the surname include:

- Oleksandr Shumskyi (1890–1946), Ukrainian communist, political activist, and Soviet statesman
- Oleksii Shumskyi
- Olena Shumska, Ukrainian individual and group rhythmic gymnast
- Vitaliy Shumskyi
