= Łomy, Podlaskie Voivodeship =

Łomy
- Village
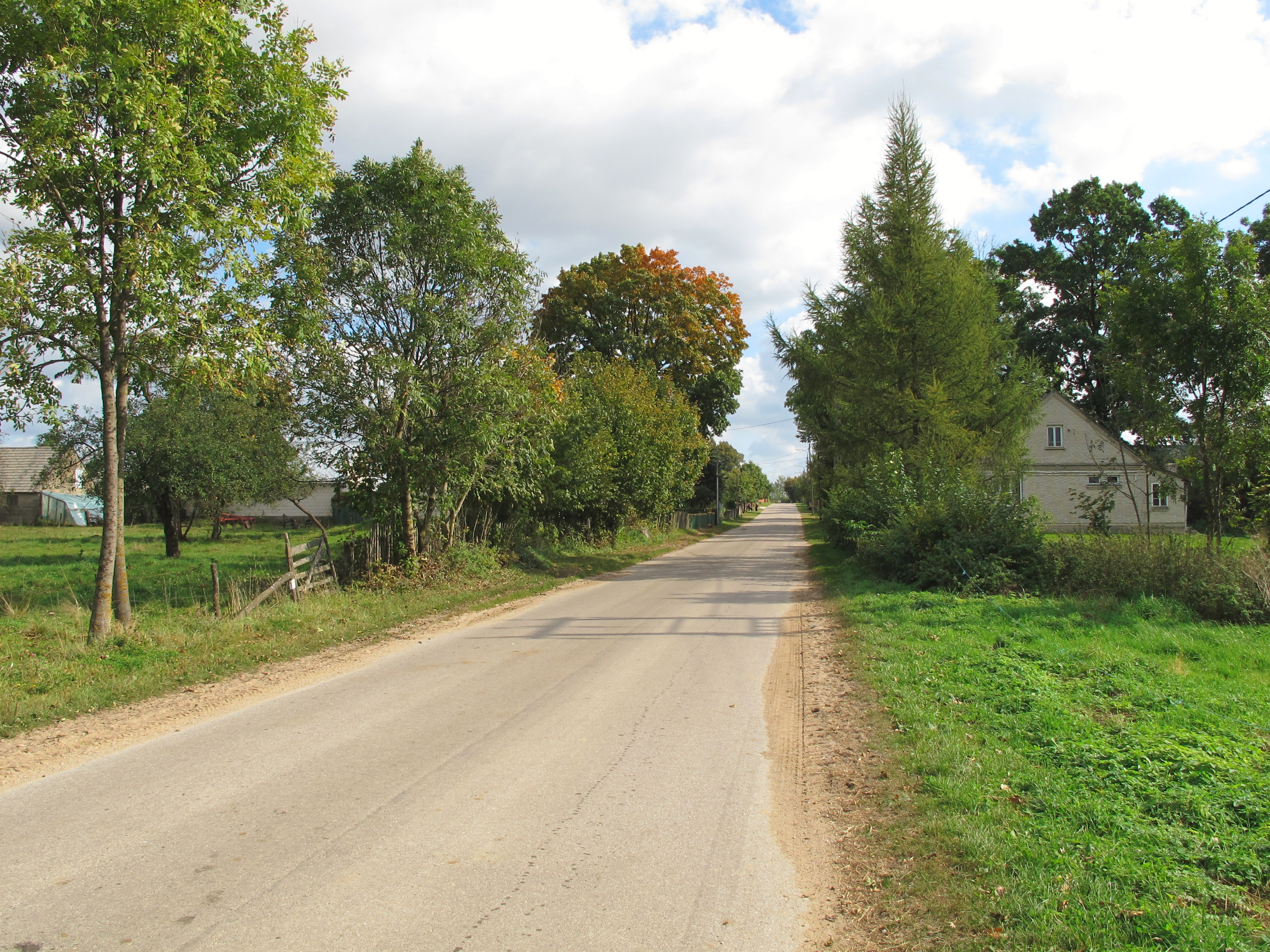

- Location within Poland
- Coordinates: 53°23′N 23°10′E
- Country: Poland
- Voivodeship: Podlaskie
- County: Sokółka
- Gmina: Korycin
- Time zone: UTC+1 (CET)
  - Summer (DST): UTC+2 (CEST)
- Vehicle registration: BSK

Łomy [ˈwɔmɨ] is a village in the administrative district of Gmina Korycin, within Sokółka County, Podlaskie Voivodeship, in north-eastern Poland.

== History ==
In the interwar period, Łomy was administratively located in the Sokółka County in the Białystok Voivodeship of Poland. According to the 1921 census, the village had a population of 86, entirely Polish by nationality and Catholic by confession.

Following the invasion of Poland in September 1939, the village was first occupied by the Soviet Union until 1941, and then by Nazi Germany until 1944.
