= Czarlona =

- Settlement
- Location within Poland
- Coordinates: 53°22′01″N 23°08′01″E
- Country: Poland
- Voivodeship: Podlaskie
- County: Sokółka
- Gmina: Korycin

Czarlona [t͡ʂarˈlɔna] is a settlement in the administrative district of Gmina Korycin, within Sokółka County, Podlaskie Voivodeship, in north-eastern Poland.
