= Shumsky =

Shumsky, feminine: Shumskaya is a Russian surname. Polish equivalent:Szumski/Szumska, Ukrainian:Shumskyi/Shumska. Notable people with the surname include:

- Alexander Shumsky
- Ellen Shumsky
- Oscar Shumsky
- Sergey Shumsky
- Yuri Shumsky (1887—1954) Ukrainian Soviet actor
