= Zakale =

- Village
- Location within Poland
- Coordinates: 53°22′15″N 23°08′43″E
- Country: Poland
- Voivodeship: Podlaskie
- County: Sokółka
- Gmina: Korycin

Zakale [zaˈkalɛ] is a village in the administrative district of Gmina Korycin, within Sokółka County, Podlaskie Voivodeship, in north-eastern Poland.
