= Bombla =

- Village
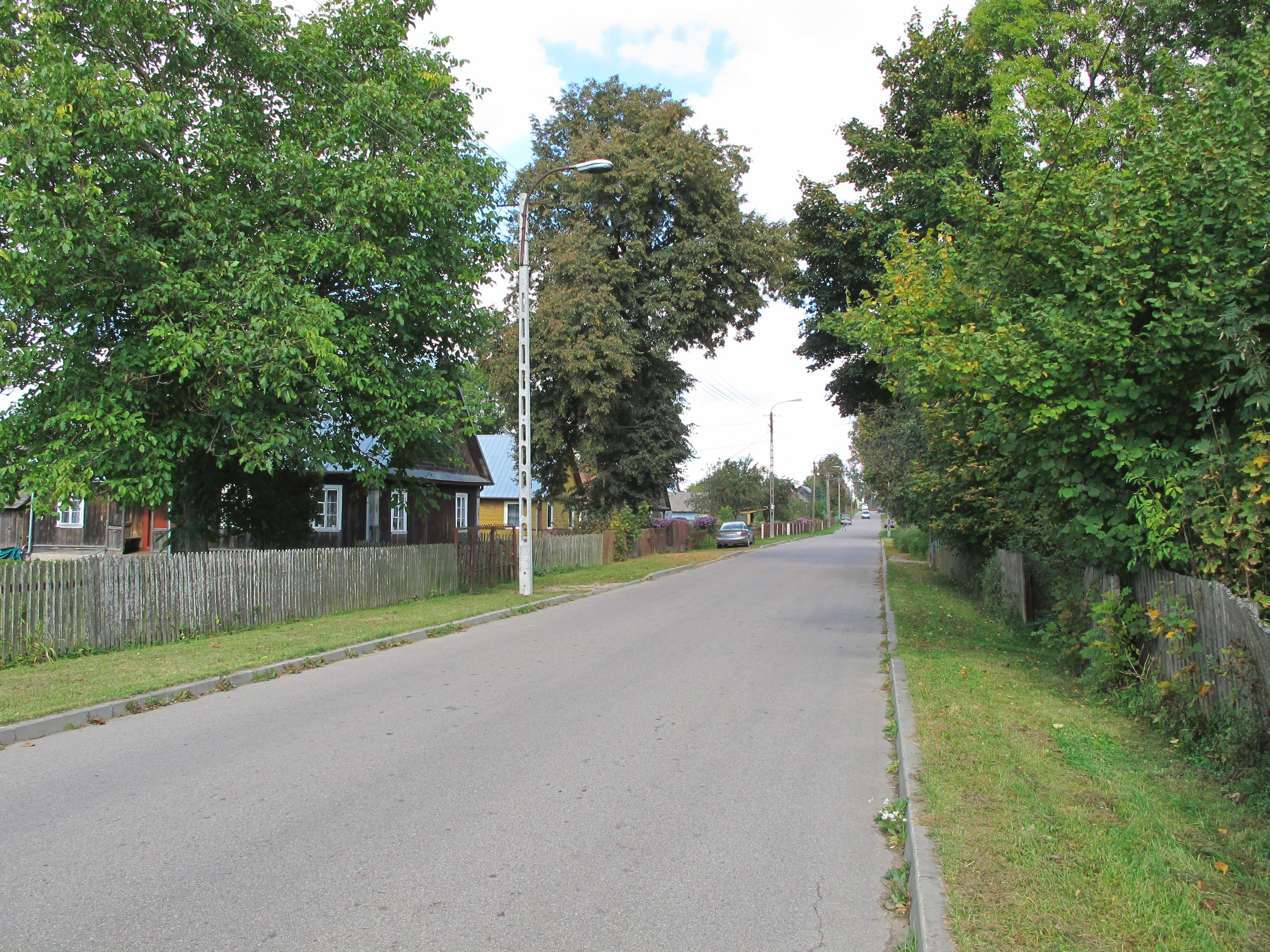

- Location within Poland
- Coordinates: 53°22′N 23°9′E
- Country: Poland
- Voivodeship: Podlaskie
- County: Sokółka
- Gmina: Korycin

Bombla [ˈbɔmbla] is a village in the administrative district of Gmina Korycin, within Sokółka County, Podlaskie Voivodeship, in north-eastern Poland.
