= Mielewszczyzna =

- Settlement
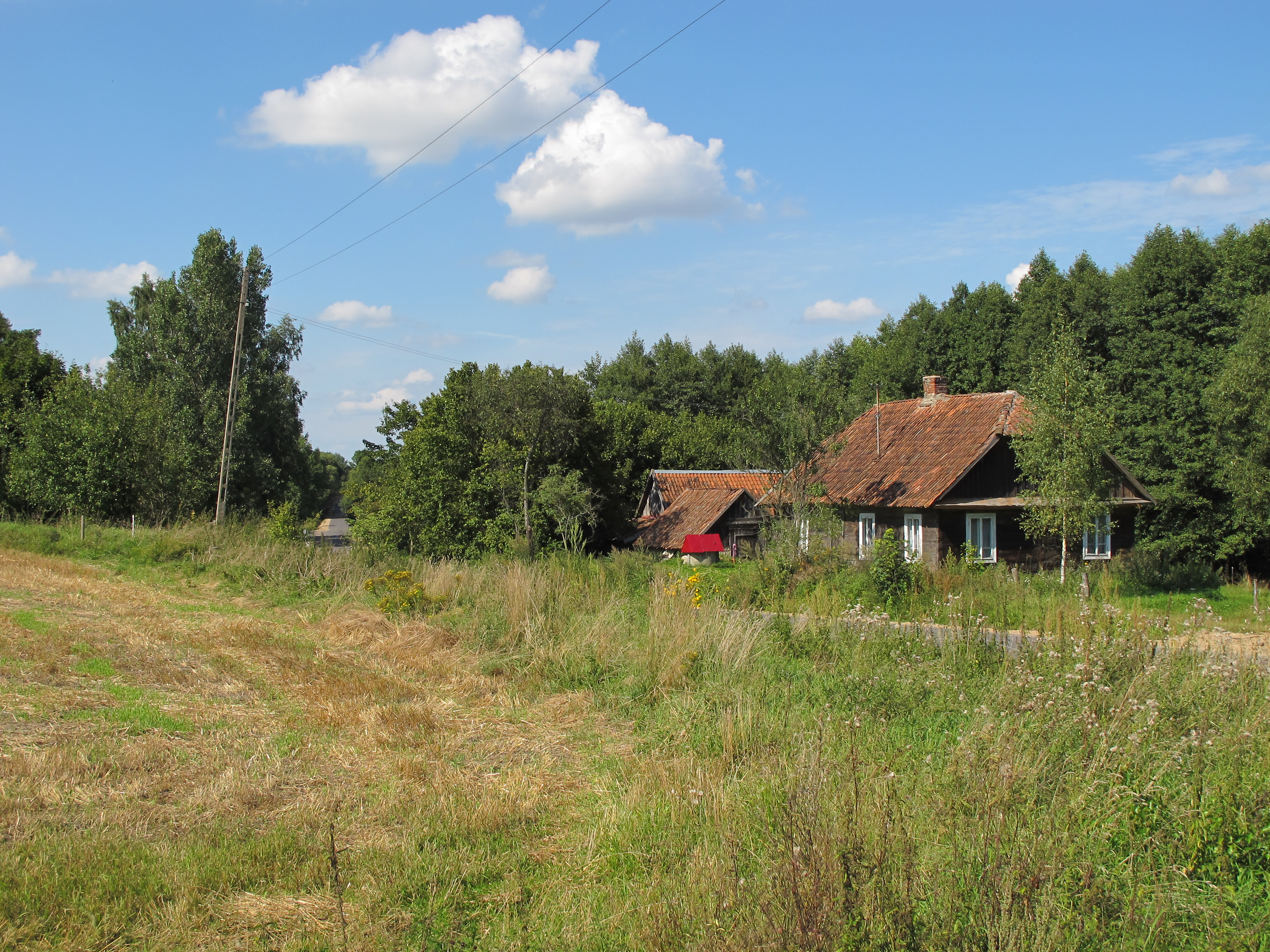
- Street of Mielewszczyzna

- Location within Poland
- Coordinates: 53°23′01″N 23°11′01″E
- Country: Poland
- Voivodeship: Podlaskie
- County: Sokółka
- Gmina: Korycin

Mielewszczyzna [mjɛlɛfʂˈt͡ʂɨzna] is a settlement in the administrative district of Gmina Korycin, within Sokółka County, Podlaskie Voivodeship, in north-eastern Poland.
