= Zagórze, Podlaskie Voivodeship =

Zagórze
- Village
- Location within Poland
- Coordinates: 53°29′N 23°6′E
- Country: Poland
- Voivodeship: Podlaskie
- County: Sokółka
- Gmina: Korycin

Zagórze [zaˈɡuʐɛ] is a village in the administrative district of Gmina Korycin, within Sokółka County, Podlaskie Voivodeship, in north-eastern Poland.
