= Popiołówka =

- Village
- Location within Poland
- Coordinates: 53°24′N 23°7′E
- Country: Poland
- Voivodeship: Podlaskie
- County: Sokółka
- Gmina: Korycin

Popiołówka [pɔpjɔˈwufka] is a village in the administrative district of Gmina Korycin, within Sokółka County, Podlaskie Voivodeship, in north-eastern Poland.
