= Przesławka =

- Village
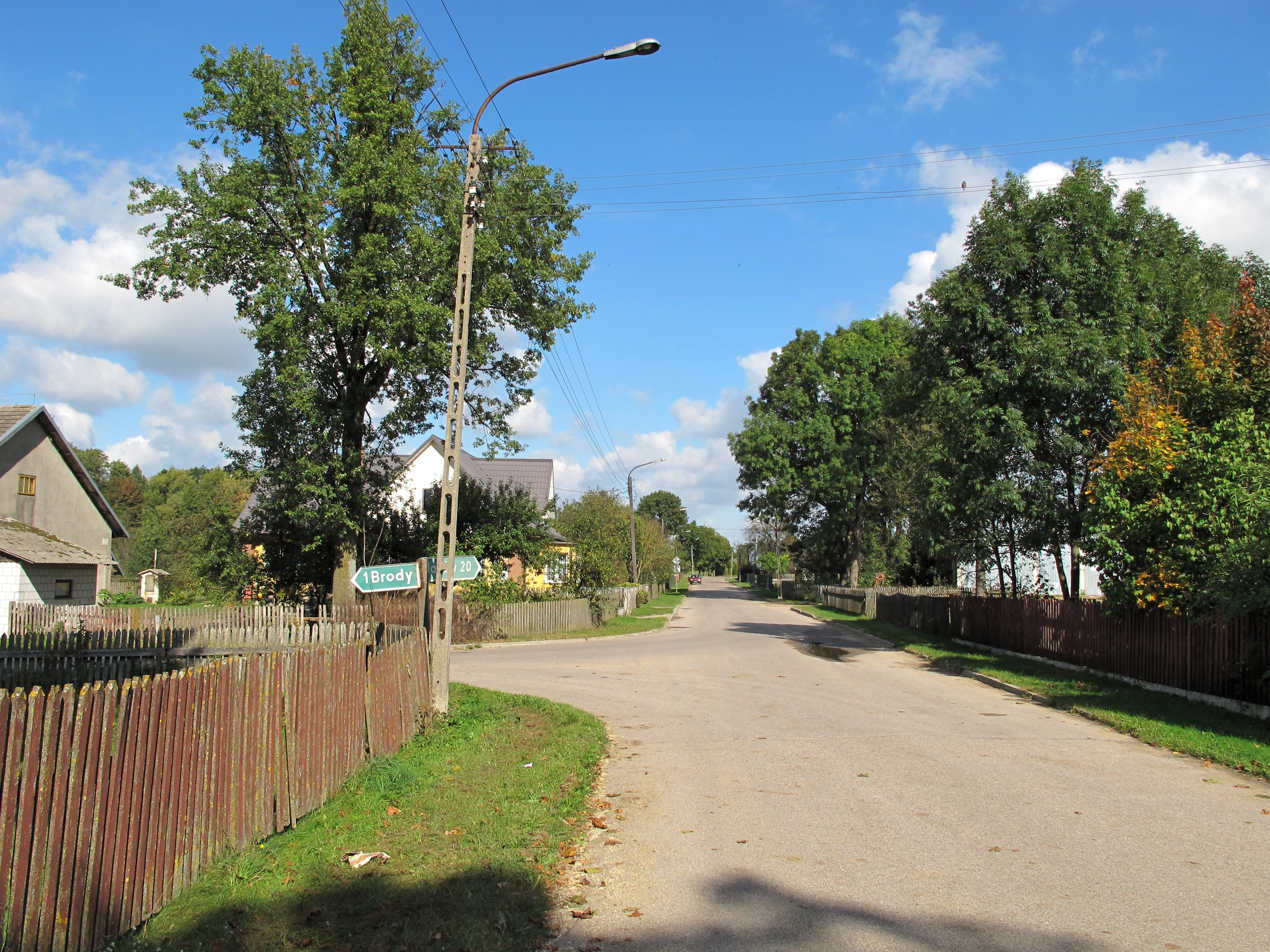
- Street of Przesławka

- Location within Poland
- Coordinates: 53°24′05″N 23°07′05″E
- Country: Poland
- Voivodeship: Podlaskie
- County: Sokółka
- Gmina: Korycin

Przesławka [pʂɛˈswafka] is a village in the administrative district of Gmina Korycin, within Sokółka County, Podlaskie Voivodeship, in north-eastern Poland.
