= Korycin =

- Village
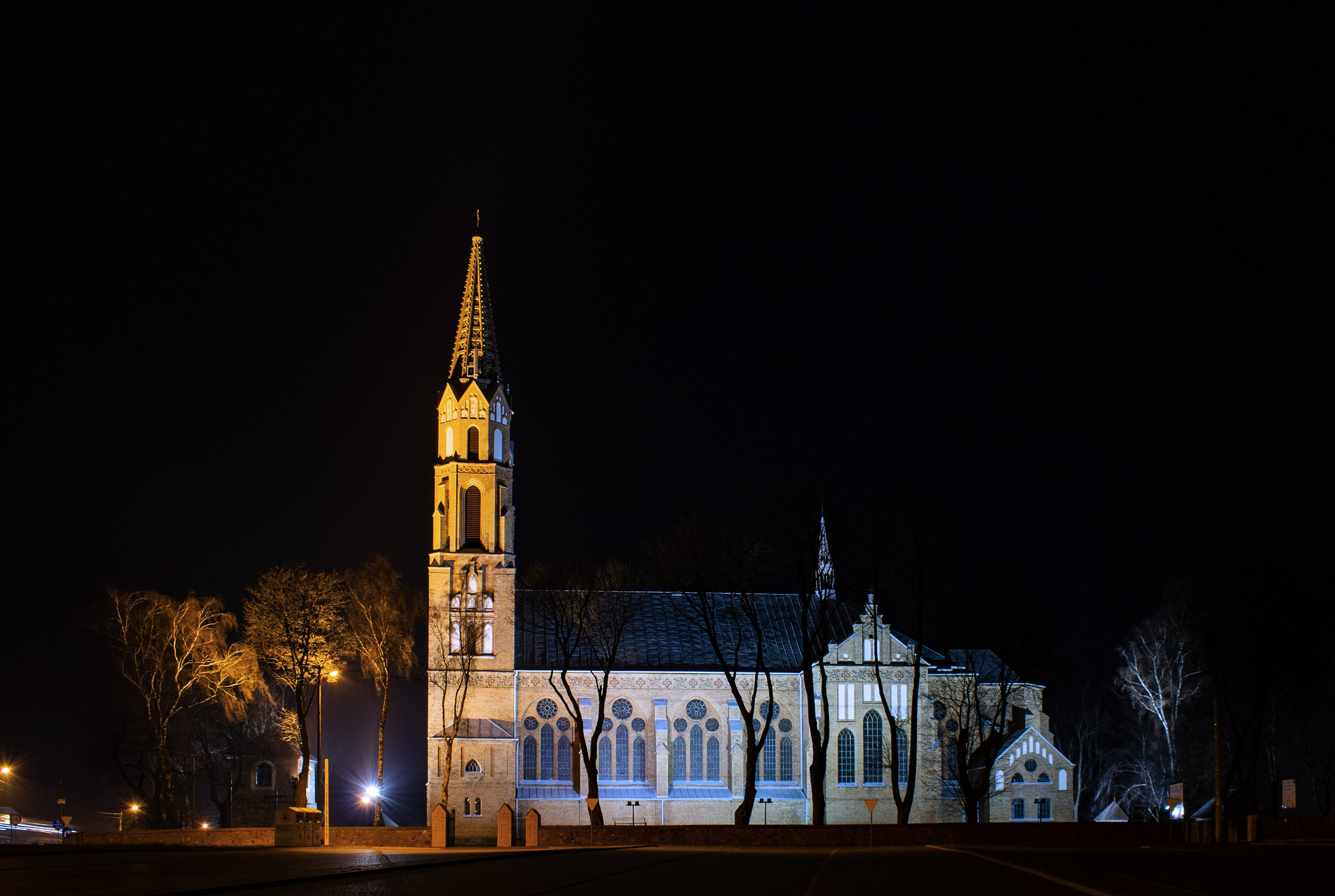
- Invention and Exaltation of the Holy Cross church at night

- Location within Poland
- Coordinates: 53°29′N 22°56′E
- Country: Poland
- Voivodeship: Podlaskie
- County: Sokółka
- Gmina: Korycin

Population
  - Total: 530
- Time zone: UTC+1 (CET)
  - Summer (DST): UTC+2 (CEST)
- Postal code: 16-140
- Vehicle registration: BSK

Korycin ([kɔˈrɨt͡ɕin]; Yiddish: קוריצין, romanized: Kartchin) is a village in Sokółka County, Podlaskie Voivodeship, in north-eastern Poland. It is the seat of the gmina (administrative district) called Gmina Korycin.

The Korycinski cheese is traditional food of Korycin, as designated by the Ministry of Agriculture and Rural Development of Poland.

== History ==
Town rights were granted in 1671 and revoked in 1897.

In 1900, there were 411 Jews living in Korycin.

Following the German-Soviet invasion of Poland, which started World War II in September 1939, the town was initially occupied by the Soviet Union until 1941, and then by Germany until 1944. Nearly all Jews were murdered by the Germans and their collaborators during the Holocaust. Afterwards, the settlement was restored to Poland, although with a Soviet-installed communist regime, which stayed in power until the Fall of Communism in the 1980s. The Polish anti-communist resistance was active in Korycin, and in 1945 it raided a local communist police station.
