= Gmina Korycin =

Gmina Korycin Korycin Commune
- Gmina
- Flag Coat of arms

- Gmina Korycin within the Sokółka County
- Coordinates (Korycin): 53°29′N 22°56′E
- Country: Poland
- Voivodeship: Podlaskie
- County: Sokółka
- Seat: Korycin

Area
  - Total: 117.32 km^{2} (45.30 sq mi)

Population (2006)
  - Total: 3,524
  - Density: 30.04/km^{2} (77.80/sq mi)
- Website: http://www.korycin.pl

Gmina Korycin is a rural gmina (administrative district) in Sokółka County, Podlaskie Voivodeship, in north-eastern Poland. Its seat is the village of Korycin, which lies approximately 39 kilometres (24 mi) west of Sokółka and 44 km (27 mi) north of the regional capital Białystok.

The gmina covers an area of 117.32 square kilometres (45.3 sq mi), and as of 2006 its total population is 3,524.

== Villages ==
Gmina Korycin contains the villages and settlements of Aulakowszczyzna, Białystoczek, Bombla, Borek, Brody, Czarlona, Długi Ług, Dzięciołówka, Gorszczyzna, Korycin, Krukowszczyzna, Kumiała, Laskowszczyzna, Łomy, Łosiniec, Mielewszczyzna, Mielniki, Nowinka, Olszynka, Ostra Góra, Popiołówka, Przesławka, Romaszkówka, Rudka, Rykaczewo, Skindzierz, Stok, Szaciłówka, Szumowo, Wojtachy, Wyłudki, Wyłudy, Wysiółki, Wysokie, Zabrodzie, Zagórze and Zakale.

== Neighbouring gminas ==
Gmina Korycin is bordered by the gminas of Czarna Białostocka, Janów, Jasionówka, Jaświły and Suchowola.
