= Wyłudy, Podlaskie Voivodeship =

Wyłudy
- Village
- Location within Poland
- Coordinates: 53°28′51″N 23°8′41″E
- Country: Poland
- Voivodeship: Podlaskie
- County: Sokółka
- Gmina: Korycin

Wyłudy [vɨˈwudɨ] is a village in the administrative district of Gmina Korycin, within Sokółka County, Podlaskie Voivodeship, in north-eastern Poland.
