= Korycinski =

Polish cheese made from cow's milk

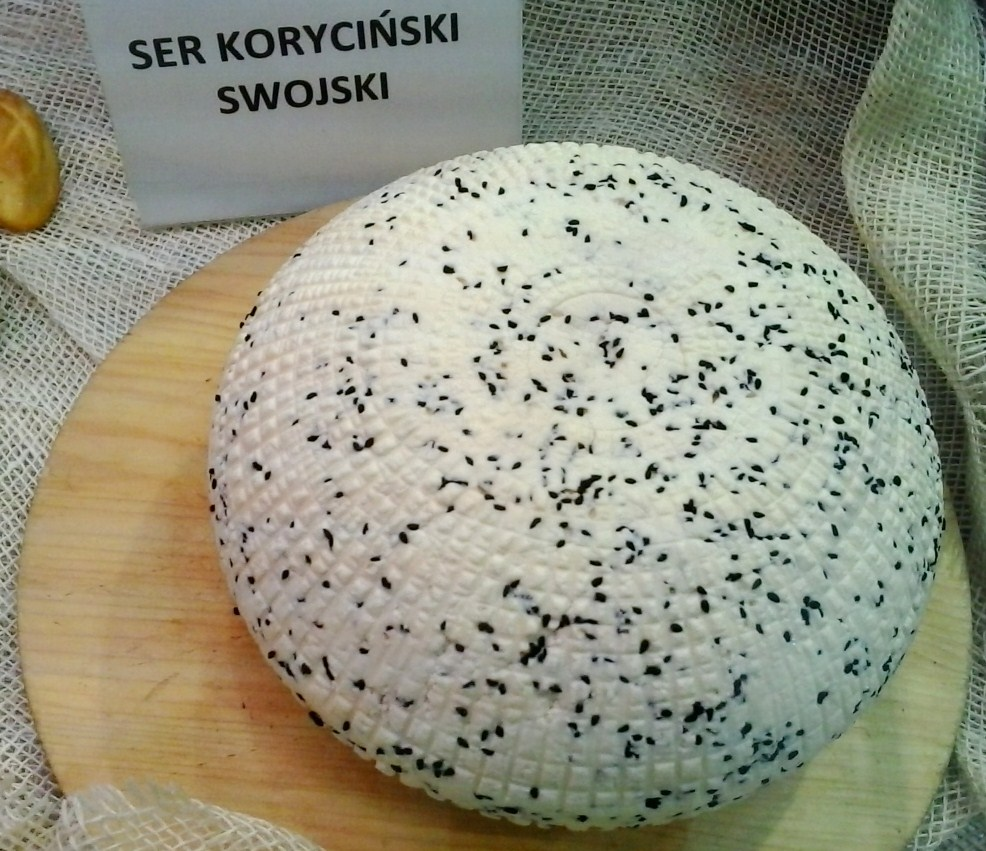
Korycinski cheese

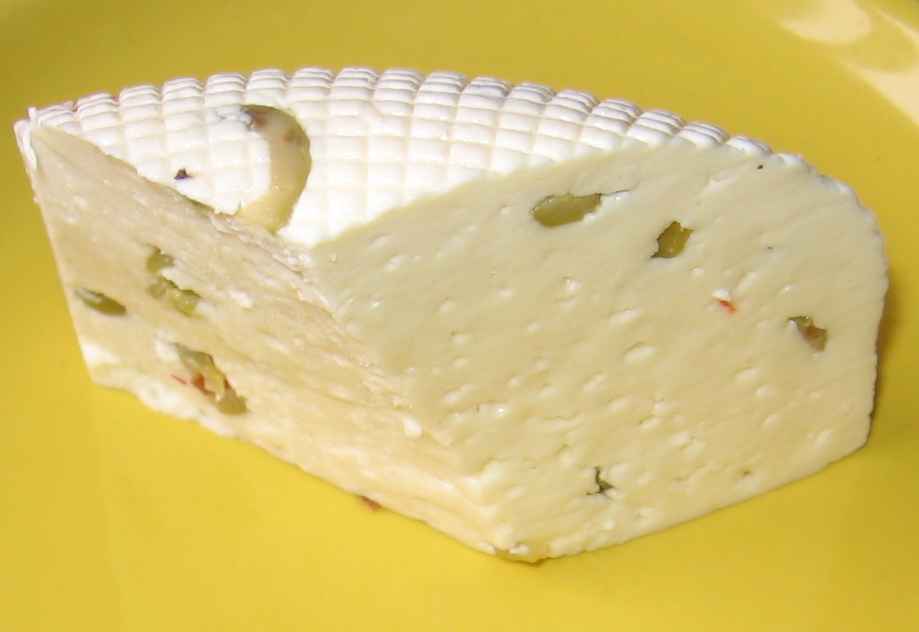
Korycinski cheese, version flavoured with peppers and olives

Koryciński, also known as "Swojski" (homemade), is a hard cheese made from cow's milk, named after the village of Korycin in Poland, and made in the Podlaskie Voivodeship in eastern Poland. In the traditional technique of producing the cheese, dried and powderized veal stomachs were used as rennet. The cheese takes the form of a flattened ball with a diameter of 30 cm and weight of 3 kg. Normally, around 25 litres of milk are used to produce it. It is considered to be the oldest Polish cheese. Currently, different varieties of the cheese are produced, most notably the ones with herbs and garlic added as ingredients.

In 2005, the Koryciński cheese was included on the list of traditional food products by the Ministry of Agriculture of Poland.

== See also ==
- Polish cuisine
