= Rudka, Sokółka County =

Rudka
- Village
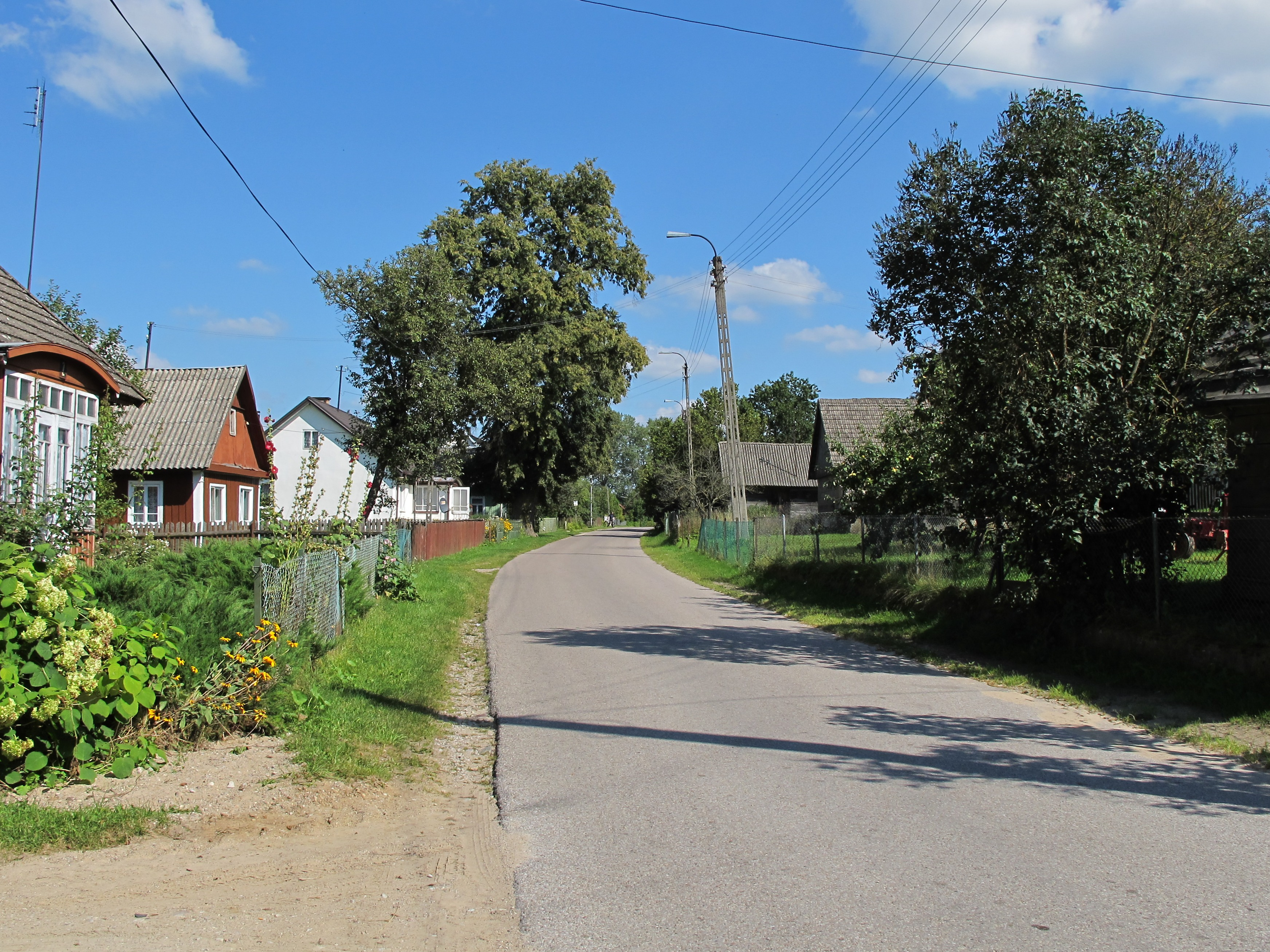

- Location within Poland
- Coordinates: 53°26′15″N 23°6′42″E
- Country: Poland
- Voivodeship: Podlaskie
- County: Sokółka
- Gmina: Korycin
- Population: 60

Rudka [ˈrutka] is a village in the administrative district of Gmina Korycin, within Sokółka County, Podlaskie Voivodeship, in north-eastern Poland.
