= Aulakowszczyzna =

- Village
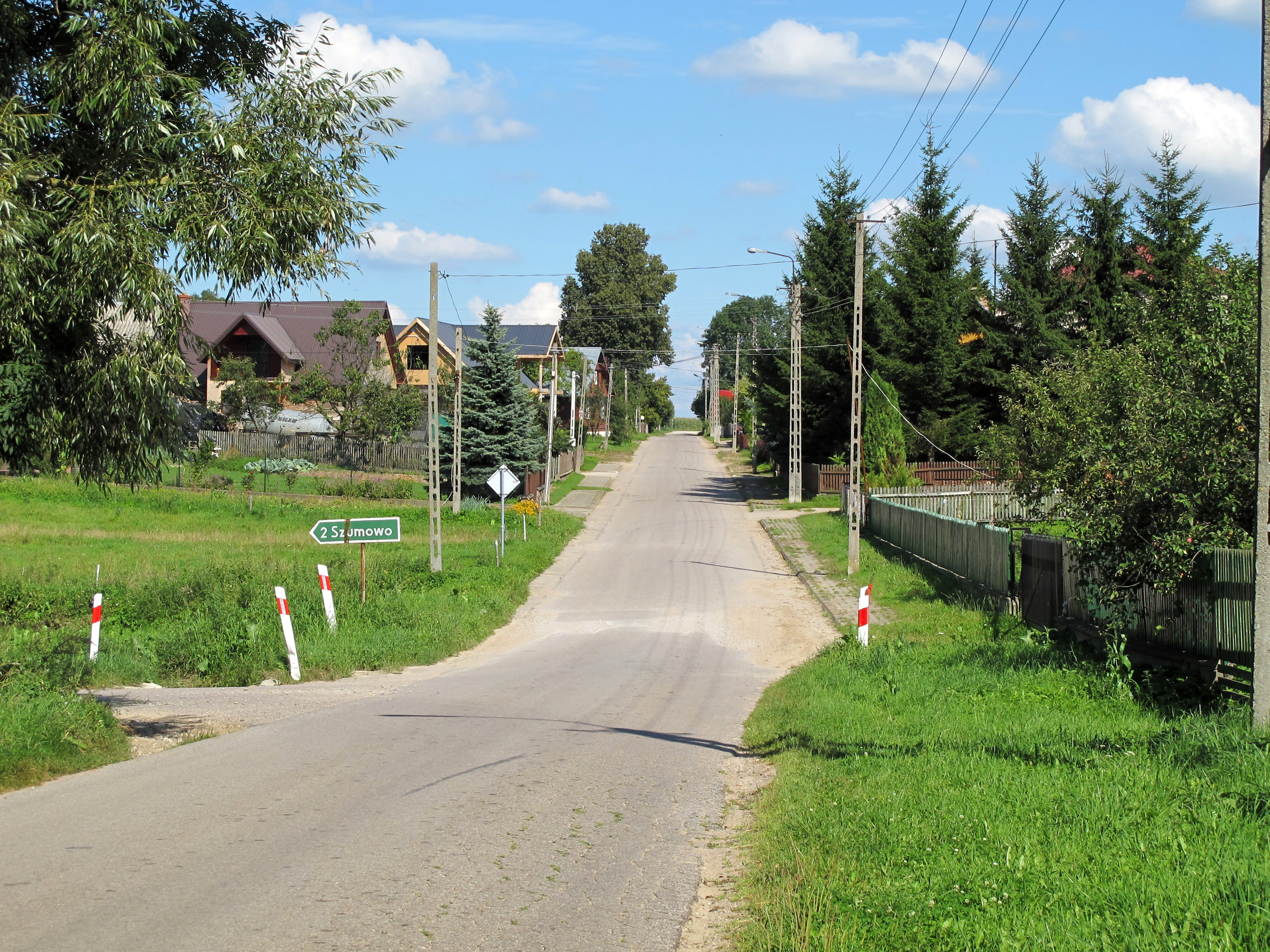

- Location within Poland
- Coordinates: 53°26′22″N 23°9′7″E
- Country: Poland
- Voivodeship: Podlaskie
- County: Sokółka
- Gmina: Korycin
- Website: https://web.archive.org/web/20060430103337/http://aula.republika.pl/

Aulakowszczyzna [aulakɔfʂˈt͡ʂɨzna] is a village in the administrative district of Gmina Korycin, within Sokółka County, Podlaskie Voivodeship, in north-eastern Poland.
