= Rykaczewo, Podlaskie Voivodeship =

Rykaczewo
- Village
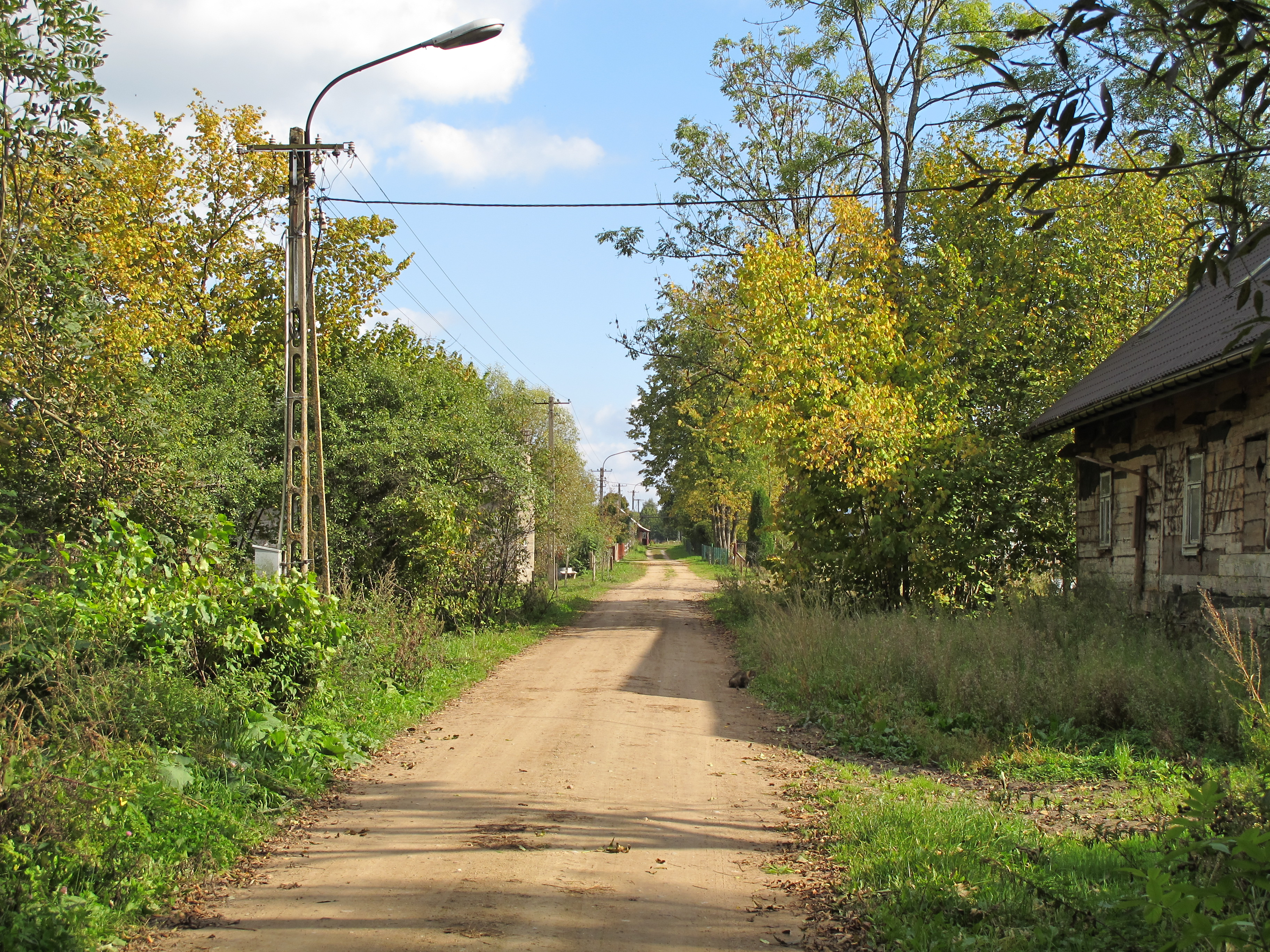

- Location within Poland
- Coordinates: 53°22′01″N 23°08′51″E
- Country: Poland
- Voivodeship: Podlaskie
- County: Sokółka
- Gmina: Korycin

Rykaczewo [rɨkaˈt͡ʂɛvɔ] is a village in the administrative district of Gmina Korycin, within Sokółka County, Podlaskie Voivodeship, in north-eastern Poland.
