= Romaszkówka =

- Village
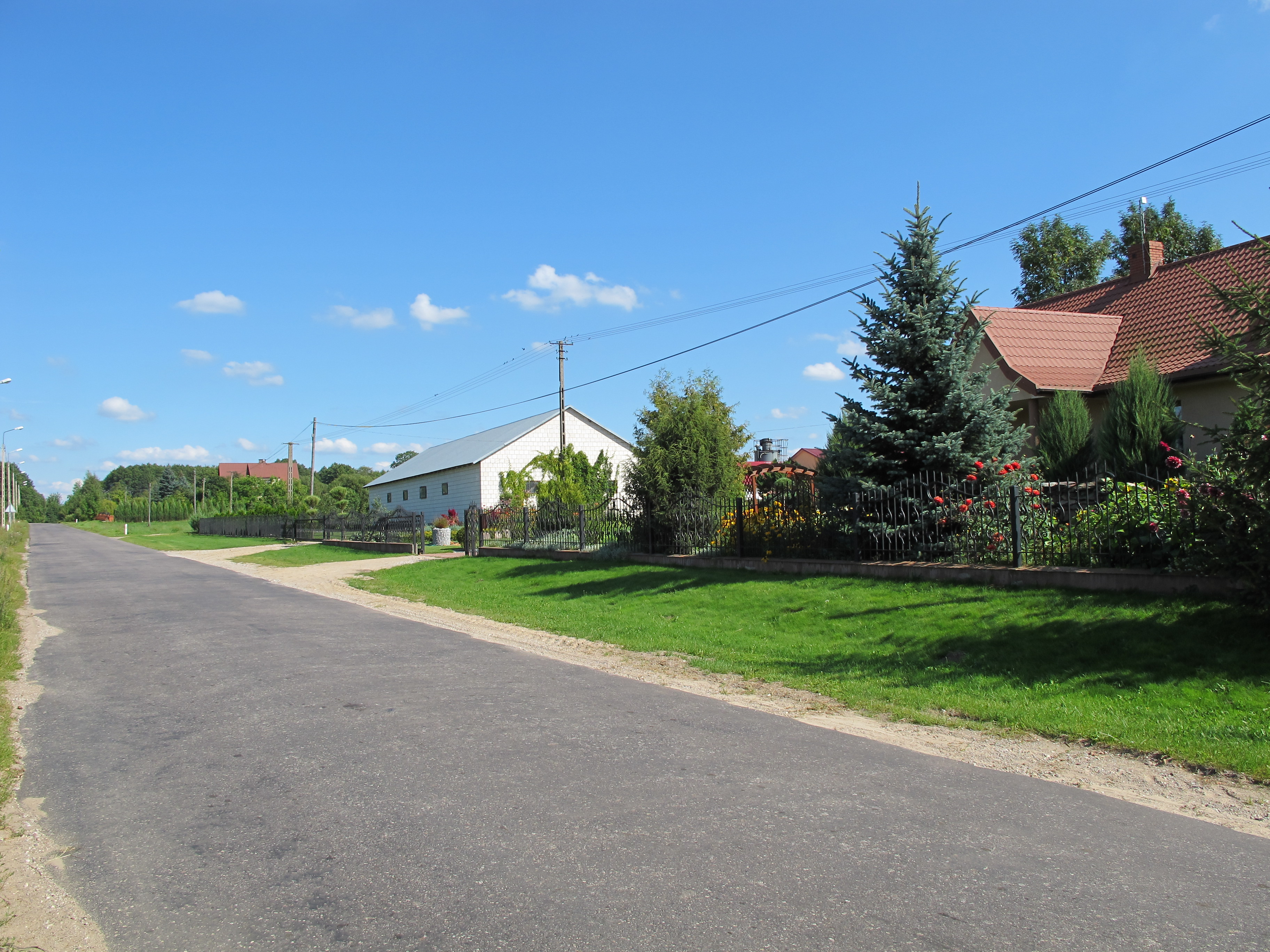
- View of Romaszkówka

- Location within Poland
- Coordinates: 53°28′00″N 23°09′00″E
- Country: Poland
- Voivodeship: Podlaskie
- County: Sokółka
- Gmina: Korycin

Romaszkówka [rɔmaʂˈkufka] is a village in the administrative district of Gmina Korycin, within Sokółka County, Podlaskie Voivodeship, in north-eastern Poland.
