= Borek, Sokółka County =

Borek
- Settlement
- Location within Poland
- Coordinates: 53°22′09″N 23°08′00″E
- Country: Poland
- Voivodeship: Podlaskie
- County: Sokółka
- Gmina: Korycin

Borek [ˈbɔrɛk] is a settlement in the administrative district of Gmina Korycin, within Sokółka County, Podlaskie Voivodeship, in north-eastern Poland.
