= Nowinka, Gmina Korycin =

Nowinka
- Village
- Location within Poland
- Coordinates: 53°22′10″N 23°08′56″E
- Country: Poland
- Voivodeship: Podlaskie
- County: Sokółka
- Gmina: Korycin

Nowinka [nɔˈviŋka] is a village in the administrative district of Gmina Korycin, within Sokółka County, Podlaskie Voivodeship, in north-eastern Poland.
