= Łosiniec, Podlaskie Voivodeship =

Łosiniec
- Village
- Location within Poland
- Coordinates: 53°23′N 23°11′E
- Country: Poland
- Voivodeship: Podlaskie
- County: Sokółka
- Gmina: Korycin

Łosiniec [wɔˈɕiɲɛt͡s] is a village in the administrative district of Gmina Korycin, within Sokółka County, Podlaskie Voivodeship, in north-eastern Poland.
