= Białystoczek =

- Village
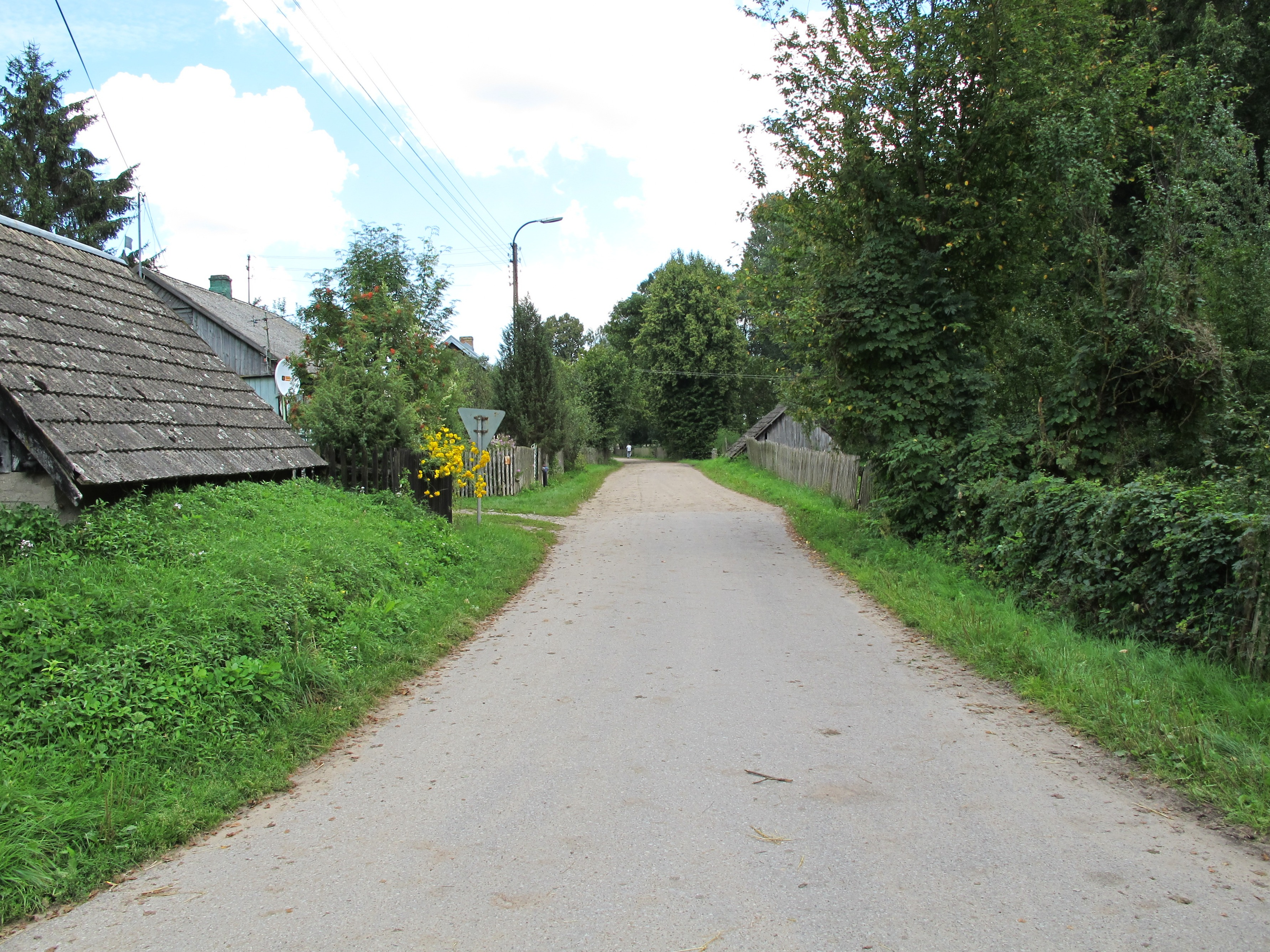

- Location within Poland
- Coordinates: 53°24′N 23°5′E
- Country: Poland
- Voivodeship: Podlaskie
- County: Sokółka
- Gmina: Korycin

Białystoczek [bjawɨsˈtɔt͡ʂɛk] is a village in the administrative district of Gmina Korycin, within Sokółka County, Podlaskie Voivodeship, in north-eastern Poland.
