= Olszynka, Podlaskie Voivodeship =

Olszynka
- Village
- Location within Poland
- Coordinates: 53°22′05″N 23°08′55″E
- Country: Poland
- Voivodeship: Podlaskie
- County: Sokółka
- Gmina: Korycin

Olszynka [ɔlˈʂɨŋka] is a village in the administrative district of Gmina Korycin, within Sokółka County, Podlaskie Voivodeship, in north-eastern Poland.
