= Szumski =

Szumski (feminine Szumska) is a Polish surname. Russian equivalent: Shumsky. Notable people with the surname include:

- Jakub Szumski (born 1992), Polish footballer
- Krzysztof Szumski (born 1944), Polish diplomat
- Michał Szumski (born 1976), Polish ice dancer

== See also ==
- Szumowski
