= Beauty of Kent (apple) =

Apple cultivar

Malus domestica 'Beauty of Kent'
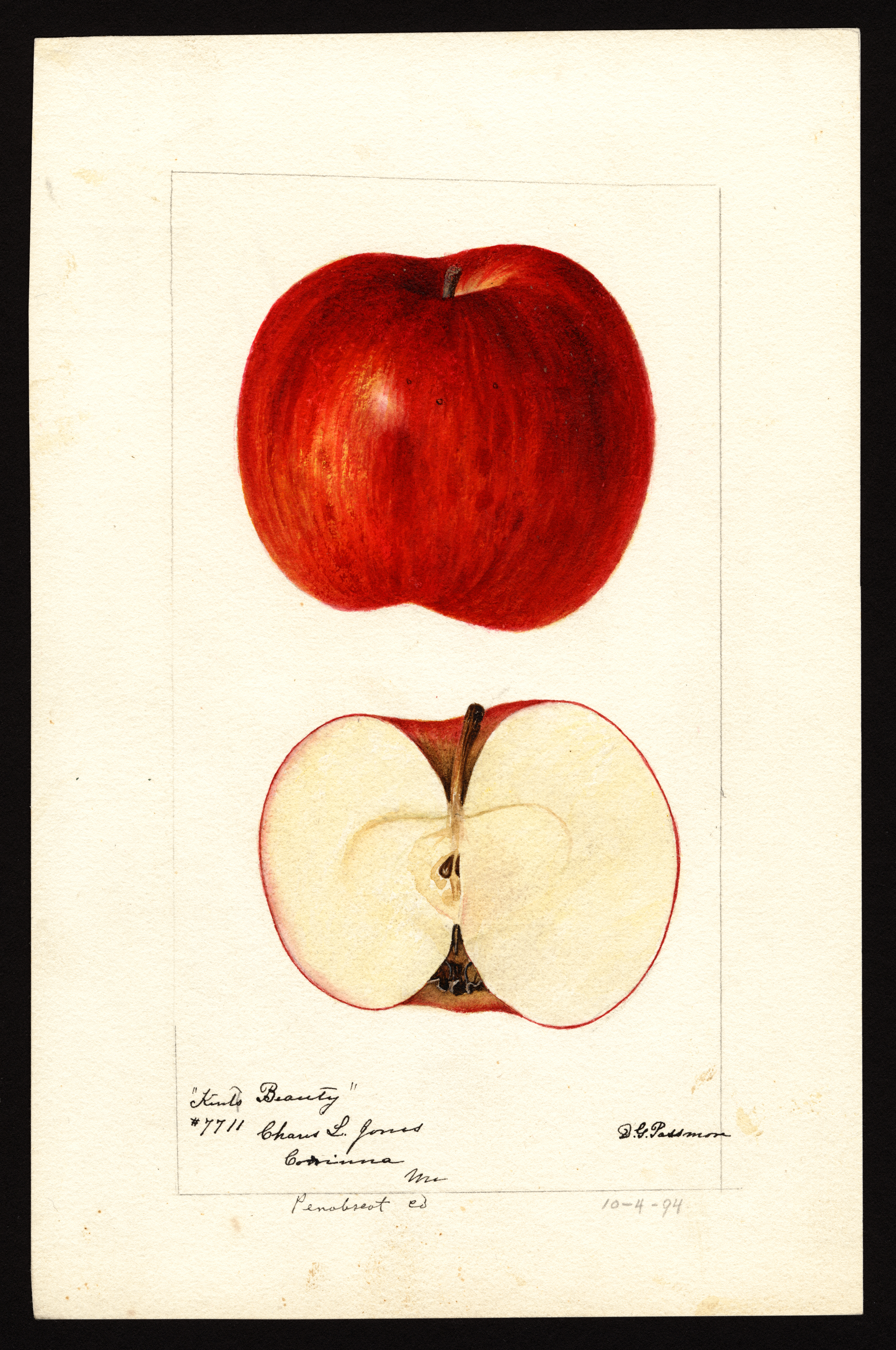
- Cultivar: Beauty of Kent
- Origin: probably England, pre 1820

'Beauty of Kent' is a cultivar of apples; the fruit are used for cooking. It is known by various names including 'Countess of Warwick', 'Gadd's Seedling', and 'Wooling's Favourite'. It received an Award of Merit from the Royal Horticultural Society in 1901 but was judged of no value for the apple-growing areas of New York State in 1913. Vitamin C 12mg/100g.
