= Josef Mariä Amstad =

Swiss politician (1846–1926)

Member of the Council of States
- In office 1884–1894

Member of the Grand Council of Nidwalden
- In office 1883–1901

Member of the Executive Council of Nidwalden
- In office 1877–1883

President of Beckenried
- In office 1874, 1901–1905

Personal details
- Born: 25 September 1846 Beckenried, Nidwalden, Switzerland
- Died: 14 February 1926 (aged 79) Engelberg, Obwalden, Switzerland
- Party: Conservative Catholic
- Spouse(s): Anna Maria Zürcher (m. 1874; died 1890) Rosa Cattani (m. 1890)
- Parent: Joseph Mariä Amstad
- Relatives: Theodor Amstad (brother); Eduard Amstad (brother)
- Occupation: Merchant, politician

Josef Mariä Amstad (25 September 1846 – 14 February 1926) was a Swiss politician, merchant, and entrepreneur from Nidwalden. He served as a member of the Council of States from 1884 to 1894 and was instrumental in establishing the central purchasing organization for Sbrinz cheese merchants in 1885.

== Early life and education ==
Amstad was born on 25 September 1846 in Beckenried, the son of Joseph Mariä Amstad, a cantonal ensign and cheese merchant. His brothers included Theodor Amstad and Eduard Amstad, who later became president of the cantonal court.

After completing language study stays in Bellinzona (1863) and Courroux (1864), Amstad entered the family business.

== Personal life ==
Amstad married twice. His first marriage in 1874 was to Anna Maria Zürcher, daughter of Johann Melchior Zürcher, a physician in Zug and supporter of the Catholic press. Following her death, he married Rosa Cattani in 1890, daughter of Maurus Cattani, an innkeeper in Engelberg.

== Political career ==
Amstad began his political career as parish administrator in 1871. He served as a communal councillor (executive) and was president of the commune of Beckenried in 1874 and again from 1901 to 1905. He was appointed cantonal ensign in 1874.

At the cantonal level, Amstad served as a conservative Catholic member of the Executive Council of Nidwalden from 1877 to 1883, followed by service in the Grand Council of Nidwalden from 1883 to 1901. At the federal level, he represented Nidwalden in the Council of States from 1884 to 1894.

== Business activities ==
In 1885, Amstad founded the central purchasing organization for Sbrinz cheese merchants, which played a significant role in the organization of this important Swiss cheese export product. He also secured special federal subsidies for the correction of torrents in Beckenried.

== Death ==
Amstad died on 14 February 1926 in Engelberg.

== Bibliography ==
- Nidwaldner Volksblatt, 17 February 1926
- Gruner, L'Assemblée, vol. 1, p. 335
- H. Lustenberger, "Sbrinz, das lukrative Exportprodukt", in Nidwaldner Sichten, 1992, pp. 87–92
