= Berner Alpkäse =

Hard cheese of the Bernese Alps

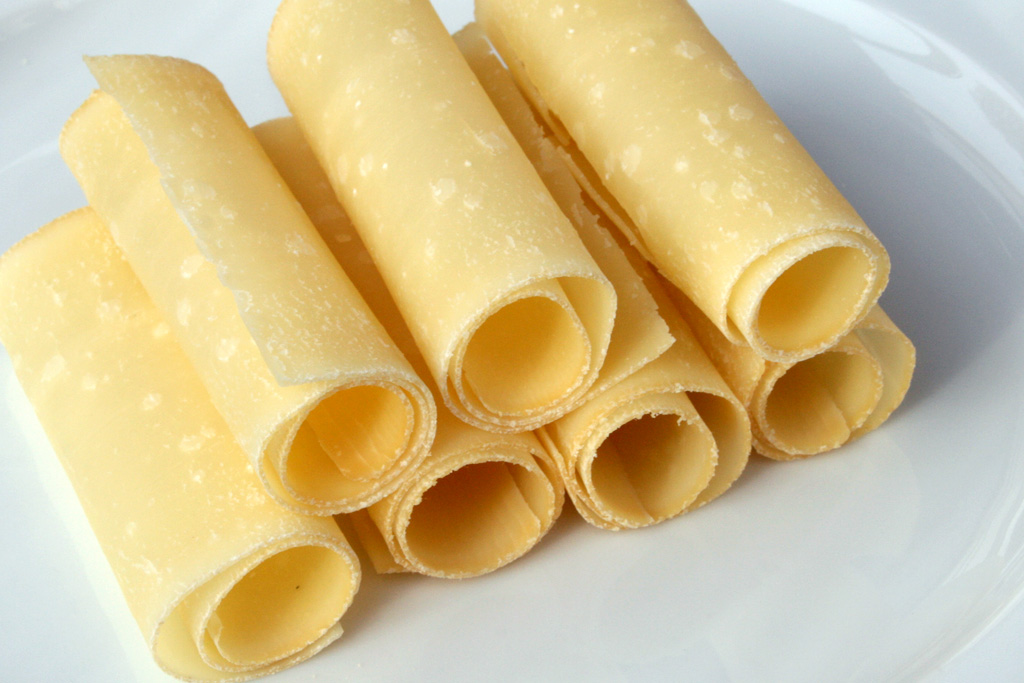
- Other names: Berner Hobelkäse
- Country of origin: Switzerland
- Region: Canton Berne
- Source of milk: Bernese Alps
- Pasteurised: no
- Texture: hard and very hard
- Fat content: 45%
- Weight: 15 kg (33 lb)
- Aging time: 6 to 30 months
- Certification: Appellation d'origine protégée (Switzerland)

Berner Alpkäse is a hard cheese produced in the Alps of the Bernese Oberland and adjacent areas of Switzerland. It is classified as a Swiss-type or Alpine cheese, and is a spicy, full-fat, raw milk cheese without holes. The cheese is manufactured exclusively with manual labour, usually on a wood fire. An extra-hard variety of Berner Alpkäse, known as Berner Hobelkäse (literally "planing" cheese), is aged for at least two years and it is this variety that is most widely available. Both Berner Alpkäse and Berner Hobelkäse are certified as AOPs in Switzerland.

The cheese is made exclusively from recognized Alpine farms during the Alpine season. Only milk from cows fed on pastures which have not been fertilised artificially may be used. The milk is highly flavoured from the Alpine herbs and is much richer in polyunsaturated fatty-acids than milk from the lowland regions.

The cheese must be made no later than 18 hours after milking. As a rule, the chilled evening milk is partly skimmed to produce a fat content of at least 45% in the final product. This is then mixed with the morning milk. The milk is heated to 33 °C (91 °F) and cultured bacteria from the region are added along with the rennet. After 30 minutes, the curds are cut with a cheese-harp into pinhead-sized grains. The curds and whey are then heated to 50 °C (122 °F) which shrinks the curds and kills any unwanted bacteria. The curds are packed into a cheese-mould and pressed for 15 hours, after which time the cheese-loaf is soaked in brine for 24 hours. The cheeses, in rounds of at least 15 kg (33 lb), are aged at a humidity of over 85% and the rind is brushed regularly with brine. The initial ripening period occurs on-site and later the cheese is aged in the cellars of cheesemongers and dairies.

After a maturation period of 6 to 18 months, the cheese is ready for consumption. The second ripening, of at least one year, occurs at a much lower humidity and the rind is no longer washed.

The annual production is about 1000 tonnes of cheese, a third of which is further processed into Hobelkäse. About 75% of production is marketed directly by the producers, and the remainder in the general trade.

Alpkäse is consumed mainly as sliced cheese. Hobelkäse is too brittle to be cut with a knife and so it is planed into thin rolls or crumbled into small pieces.

Berner Alpkäse is very similar to Sbrinz but the latter is produced in the lowlands and is much saltier, undergoing a longer brining period of 15 to 20 days.

== See also ==
- Culinary Heritage of Switzerland – Encyclopedia of Swiss cuisine
- List of cheeses – List of cheeses by place of origin
