= Karl Christen =

Swiss historian and civil servant

- Born: September 17, 1927; Stans, Nidwalden, Switzerland
- Died: April 16, 2025 (aged 97)
- Citizenship: Wolfenschiessen
- Occupations: Historian, civil servant
- Known for: Chancellor of the Grand Council of Nidwalden (1966–1992)
- Parent(s): Alois Christen (father); Sophie Odermatt (mother)

Karl Christen (17 September 1927 – 16 April 2025) was a Swiss historian and civil servant from Nidwalden. He served as chancellor of the Grand Council of Nidwalden from 1966 to 1992 and was an influential member of the commission that drafted the canton's 1965 constitution.

== Early life and education ==
Christen was born on 17 September 1927 in Stans to Alois Christen, a master mason, and Sophie Odermatt. He was of Wolfenschiessen citizenship and remained unmarried throughout his life. After attending gymnasium in Schwyz, Christen studied history and art history in Zurich, where he also completed an internship at the cantonal archives of Nidwalden.

== Career ==
Christen began his professional career in 1958 as secretary of the Heimatschutz commission. In 1966, he was appointed chancellor of the Grand Council of Nidwalden, a position he held until his retirement in 1992.

During his tenure, Christen played a significant role in the drafting of Nidwalden's 1965 constitution. With the support of Eduard Amstad, head of the Department of Justice, he served as an influential member of the constitutional drafting commission. As chancellor, Christen undertook a comprehensive reorganization of cantonal legislation, producing a systematic compilation of all cantonal laws.

In addition to his administrative work, Christen authored historical studies on the canton of Nidwalden, contributing to the documentation and understanding of the region's history.

== Bibliography ==
- "Obituary notice". Nidwaldner Zeitung. 2 September 1992.
- "Obituary notice". Tages-Anzeiger. 20 November 1992.
