= Tête de Moine =

Swiss semi-hard cheese

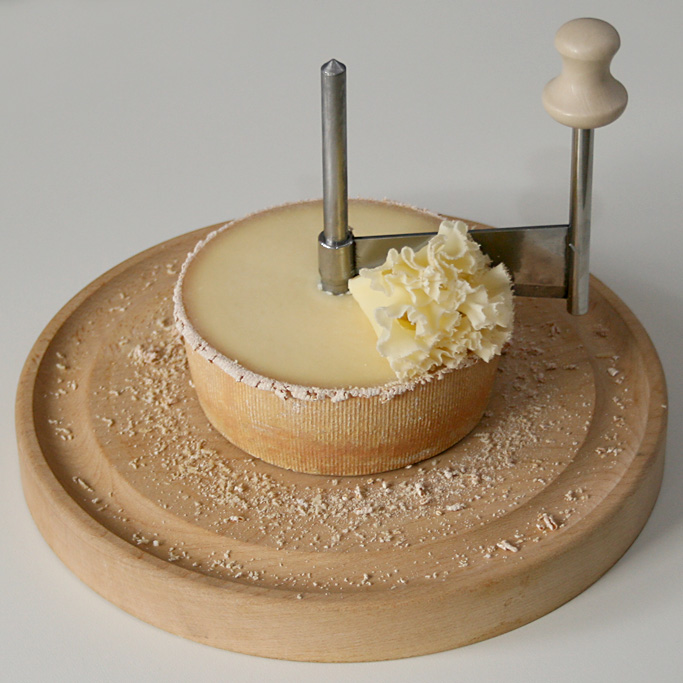
Tête de Moine AOP with girolle

Tête de Moine AOP (French pronunciation: [tɛt də mwan], French for "monk's head") is a semi-hard cheese manufactured in Switzerland. It is classified as a Swiss-type or Alpine cheese, and was invented and initially produced more than eight centuries ago by the canons of the abbey of Bellelay, located in the community of Saicourt, district of Moutier, in the mountainous zone of the Bernese Jura, the French-speaking area of the Canton of Bern as well as the Canton of Jura.

== Origin ==
The name “Tête de Moine” has been known since 1790, but its origins go far back to the 12th century. The canons at Bellelay monastery were first mentioned in connection with the production of cheese as early as 1192 (and so more than 825 years ago), a century before the Swiss Confederation was founded. In those days, they used to pay the annual rent for the various plots of land with the cheese produced at the monastery, which served as a valuable means of payment. Over time, the Tête de Moine was used by tenant farmers as payment to land owners, as well as figuring in legal settlements, being offered as a gift to the prince-bishops of Basel, and even serving as currency. Over the centuries, Alpine dairies outside of the monastery then also began to produce the cheese. In 1797 the canons were driven out of the monastery in the wake of the French Revolution, but cheese production continued in the farm-based cheese dairies. Production received a fresh boost in the 19th century when A. Hofstetter – a farmer from Bellelay – received an award for the production of his cheese in Paris. This was followed at the end of the century by the establishment of the first village cheese dairies.

The first part of the 20th century saw the development from farm-based to village cheese dairies and an increase in cheese production. From the 1970s onwards, some important events took place that opened a new chapter in the history of Tête de Moine AOP. In order to promote sales of Tête de Moine AOP and to market the cheese, the cheese dairies got together in 1978 to form the Association of Tête de Moine Producers (VTF). 1997 then saw the establishment of the “Interprofession Tête de Moine” trade organization by the milk producers, cheese makers, maturing experts and merchants.

Another important event was the invention of the Original Girolle® in 1982 by Nicolas Crevoisier, especially for Tête de Moine AOP. The paring tool got its name from the appearance of the rosettes, which are reminiscent of chanterelles (French: girolle) and gives Tête de Moine AOP its unique shape, thus enabling it to fully develop its taste. The Girolle® consists of a round, wooden plate with a vertical pin in the middle and a crank handle. The cylindrical cheese is first cut in half and then placed on the pin so that rosettes can be pared off by means of the crank. This apparatus helped to boost the consumption of this cheese.

There are two explanations for the origin of the name Tête de Moine, which translates from French literally as "monk's head". The name was first documented in the records of Mont-Terrible, a Department established by the French when they annexed the region from 1793 to 1799 at the time of the French Revolution. The first theory is that it is a mocking name bestowed by French occupation soldiers who compared the method of serving the cheese to shaving the top of a skull to create a monk’s tonsure. The second explanation is based on tales from the Jura region which refer to the number of cheeses stored at the cloister "per tonsure", or per resident.

== Production according to the original recipe ==
Today, Tête de Moine AOP is made in the region’s cheese dairies in keeping with the traditional method and original recipe, in accordance with the requirements of the AOP specifications. The oldest written description of Tête de Moine AOP dates from 1628. Already in those days it was pointed out that a fatty milk of excellent quality from the country’s best grasses and pastures had to be used to produce it. In order to guarantee the quality of freshness, milk production and fresh-milk processing take place in the AOP region. The dairy cows’ feed ration must originate entirely from the farm’s own fodder base or from adjoining communal pastures on which the cattle must be kept for at least 120 days during the green feeding period. Dairy farmers, cheesemakers and maturing experts work with the most modern equipment, but in keeping with traditional craftsmanship. The use of somatotropin, urea, products containing urea, animal meal, growth hormones or products of the same type as well as silage feed is prohibited. The maturing period begins after the salt-water bath, when the cheese loaves are stored for at least 75 days on spruce boards in the AOP geographical area, during which time they are regularly tended. Quality control on Tête de Moine AOP is carried out according to the criteria defined in the AOP specifications. A procedure known as “taxation” (quality control and approval) is carried out every month in the cheese dairies’ cellars, during which the cheese is evaluated according to the following four criteria: appearance, hole size, paste (colour, parability) as well as smell and taste.

Since May 2001, Tête de Moine, Fromage de Bellelay has been registered as a protected designation of origin and has had appellation d'origine contrôlée (AOC) status. First known as AOC (Appellation d’Origine Contrôlée), it was replaced by the appellation d’origine protégée (AOP) certification in 2010. The following year, in 2002, milk producers founded an association to defend their interests. Exported throughout the world, it is the calling card of the cheese-making tradition of the Swiss Jura. It is currently produced by fewer than 10 cheese dairies of the Jura Mountains area of Porrentruy, District of Franches-Montagnes, both situated in the Canton of Jura, as well as in Moutier and Courtelary, in the Bernese Jura.

== Characteristics ==
Tête de Moine is made from unpasteurized, raw cow's milk and is a semi-hard cheese. It is cylindrical in shape, has a diameter of 10-15 cm and a height typically equal to 70 to 100% of its diameter. The average weight of a Tête de Moine is 850 g, but some specimens can weigh as much as 2.5 kg. The reddish-brown crust is firm, grainy, lubricated, moist and healthy and the yellow-to-ivory-coloured paste is homogeneous, slightly moist, sticky and supple. The fat content averages 525 g/kg in the dry matter and at least 315 g/kg in the cheese, while its salt content can be up to 25 g/kg. Because of its fine texture, Tête de Moine AOP is not cut, but pared into rosettes with a Girolle® Original or a similar device. It is aged for a minimum of 2½ months on a small spruce plank, and is typically paired with a dry, white wine.

== See also ==
- Bellelay Abbey
- Culinary Heritage of Switzerland
- Bernese Jura
- Canton of Jura
