= Appellation d'origine protégée =

Appellation d'origine protégée may refer to:

- Protected designation of origin, a geographical indication of the European Union
- Appellation d'origine protégée (Switzerland), a geographical indication in Switzerland

== See also ==
- Appellation d'origine contrôlée, a geographical indication in France
