= Swiss cheeses and dairy products =

Cheeses and dairy products produced in Switzerland

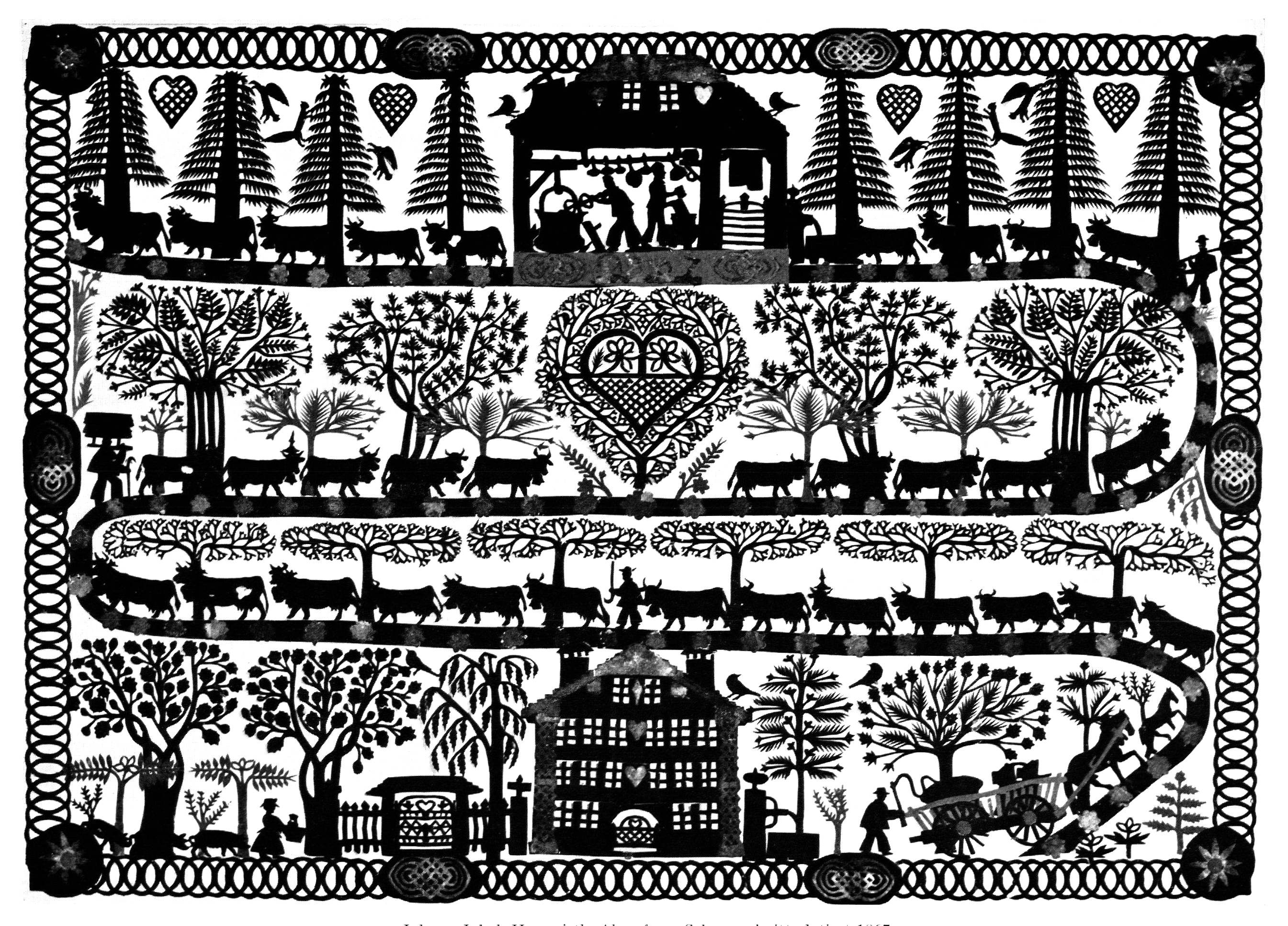
Dairy farming and cheesemaking traditions represented with paper-cutting technique (1867).

Switzerland has a strong and ancestral dairy farming and cheesemaking tradition. The breeding of cattle, sheep and goats for milk is attested in the Neolithic period and, since Antiquity, cheese has been exported from the Alpine regions. The rugged nature of the country makes approximately 80% of the agricultural land unsuitable for cultivation, which is therefore mainly exploited for cattle and sheep farming. This mode of exploitation has forged a large part of the Swiss landscape, in the Alps, the Jura Mountains, and on the Swiss Plateau.

Today, cheese dairies and mountain pastures in Switzerland produce nearly 500 varieties of cheese, not counting fresh cheeses. Most of these, and all the ones very well known internationally, are semi-hard Alpine or Swiss-type cheeses such as Emmental and Gruyère. Dairy products in general are highly appreciated throughout the country, with butter and cream being classic ingredients of Swiss cuisine.

== History ==
The breeding of cattle, sheep and goats is attested in the Neolithic period by archaeological remains (bones) throughout Switzerland. There is no direct evidence of cheese production at this time, but the old age of many cattle exhumed in coastal stations on Lake Zurich suggests that at least their milk was exploited, and Germanic peoples already made butter at that time. As the words Käse, fromage and formaggio come from the Latin caseus and caseus formaticus ("cheese made in a form"), it is likely that the art of transforming milk using rennet into fatty, salty and long-lasting cheese was known by the Romans, who brought it to the Celts when they crossed the Alps. Already in antiquity, the alpine regions of Rhaetia exported cheese.

"Swiss cheese" is first mentioned 2000 years ago by the Roman historian Pliny the Elder. In his writings of the 1st Century AD, he mentions the Caseus Helveticus, a hard Sbrinz-like cheese made by the Helvetii, who were the tribe occupying the territory of modern-day Switzerland.

In the Middle Ages, with the decline of Latin civilization, the use of rennet disappeared in German-speaking territories, but it probably continued in Romance-speaking lands. Sources from the 13th-14th centuries attest to the production of fat cheese in Lower Valais and the Gruyères region. Archaeologists have identified in medieval alpine settlements (mainly in central Switzerland) equipment for the preparation and storage of the product, such as cheese press supports, crotto-like structures used to keep milk and cheese, as well as caves that could have had the same purpose. In Bergeten (Braunwald), a cellar dug into the rock with a water cooling system was discovered. It is not known what type of cheese matured there.

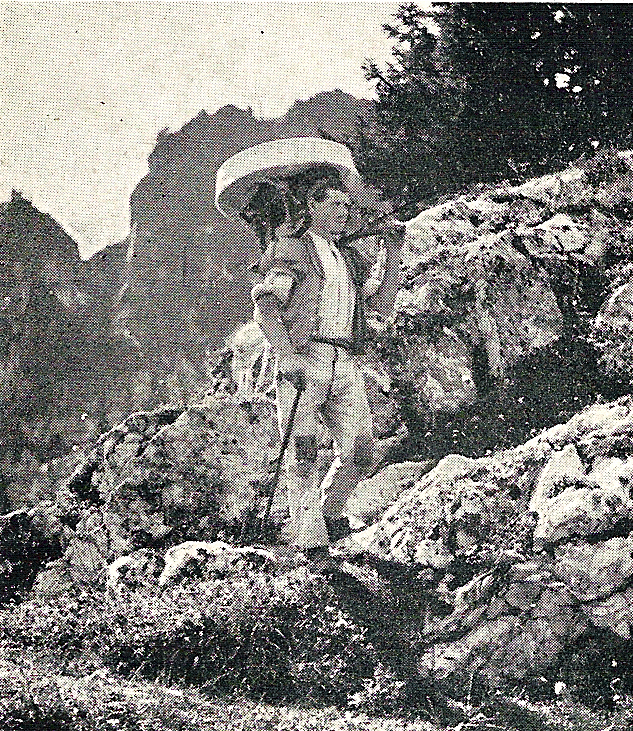
An armailli transporting a wheel of cheese from the alp.

The rise of hard cheeses is linked to the appearance of new outlets in the 15th century. The growing demand in urban markets, first in the Confederation and soon also in Italy, France and Germany, gave rise to a capital-intensive export trade. The main production regions were Gruyère and Emmental - which already produced the cheeses still known under these names.

Export cheese-making led to great changes in the economy of the villages that practiced it: on the pastures, dairy cows were summered rather than young oxen and small livestock; formerly an accessory occupation of the peasants, the cheese-making became a profession (Armailli) with improved techniques; the exploitation of mountain pastures became more rational and took, on private land, new forms marked by the spirit of enterprise. In the valleys, the cereals gave way, more or less completely, to grassland; their population thus became dependent on grain imports. In the Pre-Alps and in the Napf region, from Gruyère to Entlebuch, forests were cleared to gain meadows.

Cheese companies were therefore first established in the alpine and pre-Alpine areas of Appenzell, Schwyz, Unterwalden, Bernese Oberland and Fribourg. Those which had easy access to large lakes such as Zurich, Zug, Lucerne, Thun and Geneva, were favoured. On the other hand, the valleys of the central Alps, which were more isolated, generally continued to practice subsistence agriculture exporting only dairy surpluses, unless they found themselves, like Upper Engadine, Upper Surselva, Urseren and Leventina, on a commercial axis. In the Jura, production did not develop until the 18th century, under the impetus of Gruyère herdsmen.

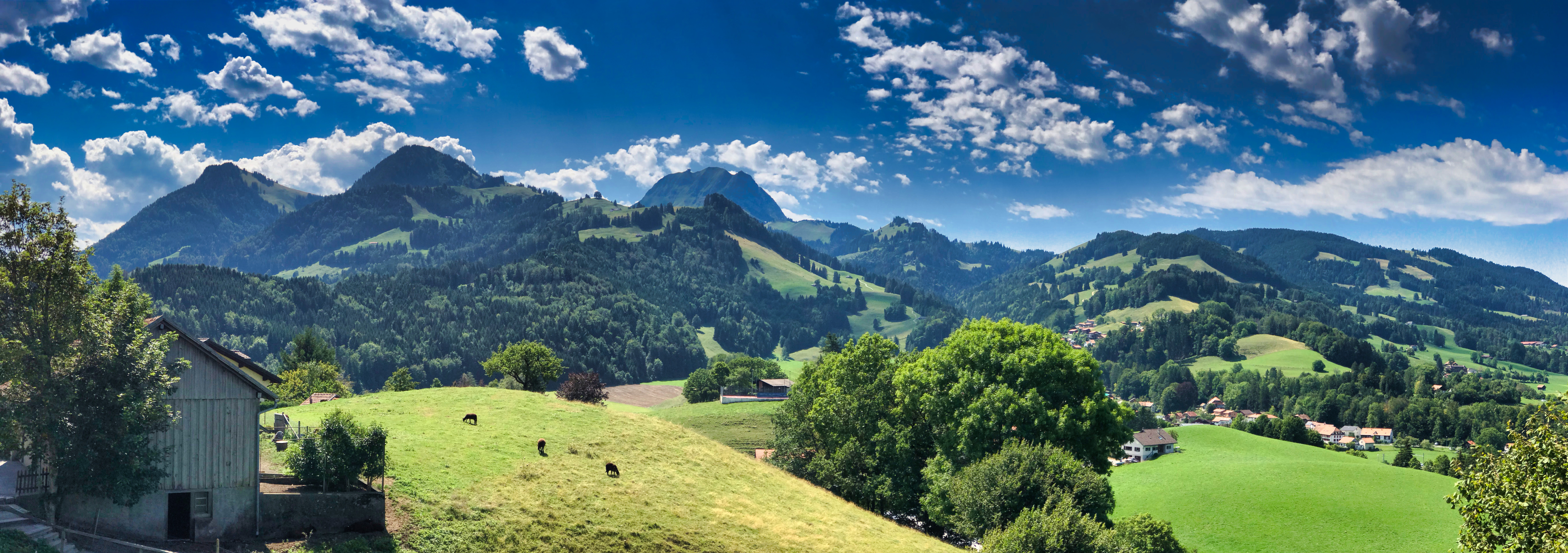
Landscape of Gruyère

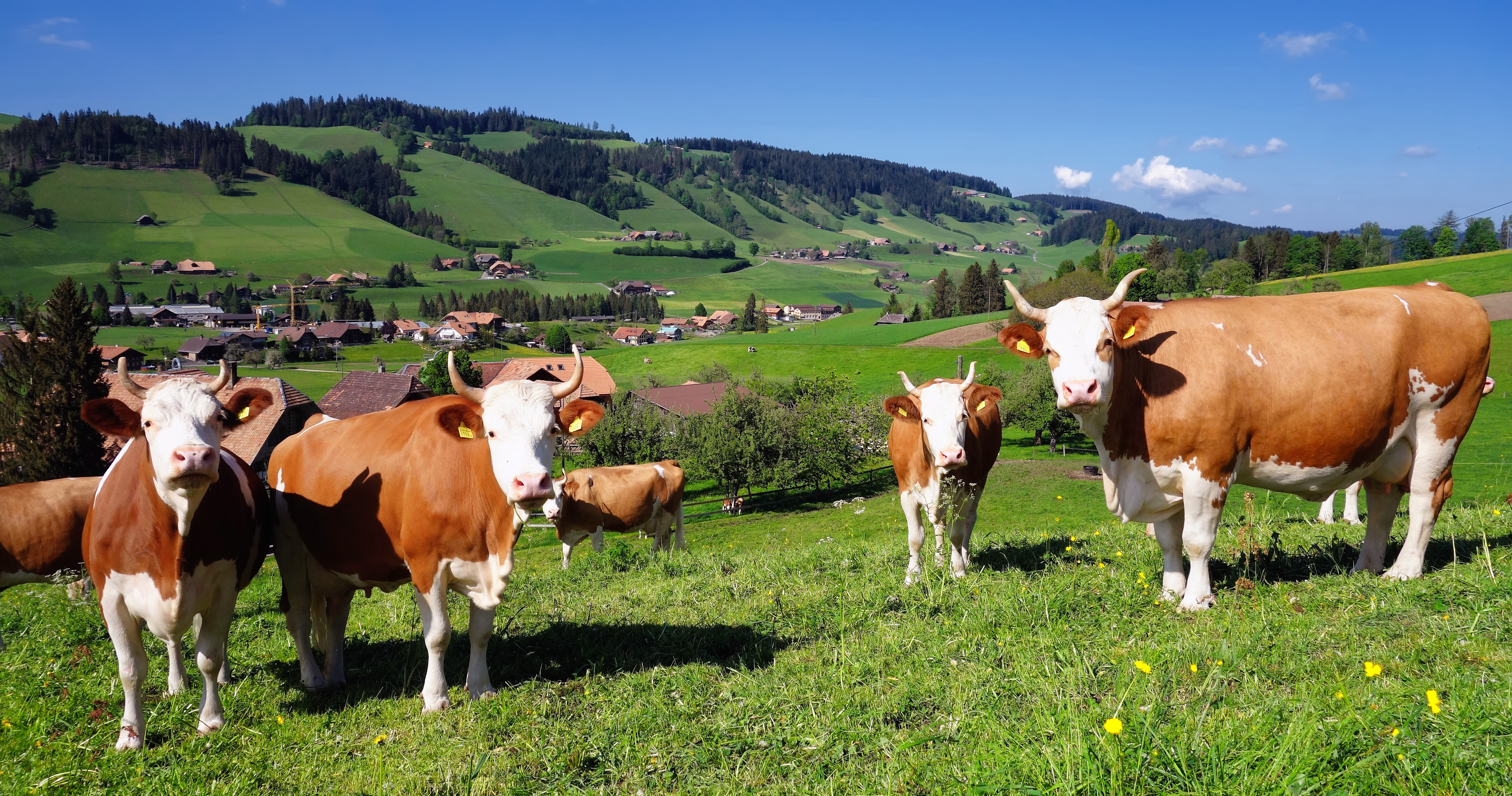
Dairy cows in the Emmental

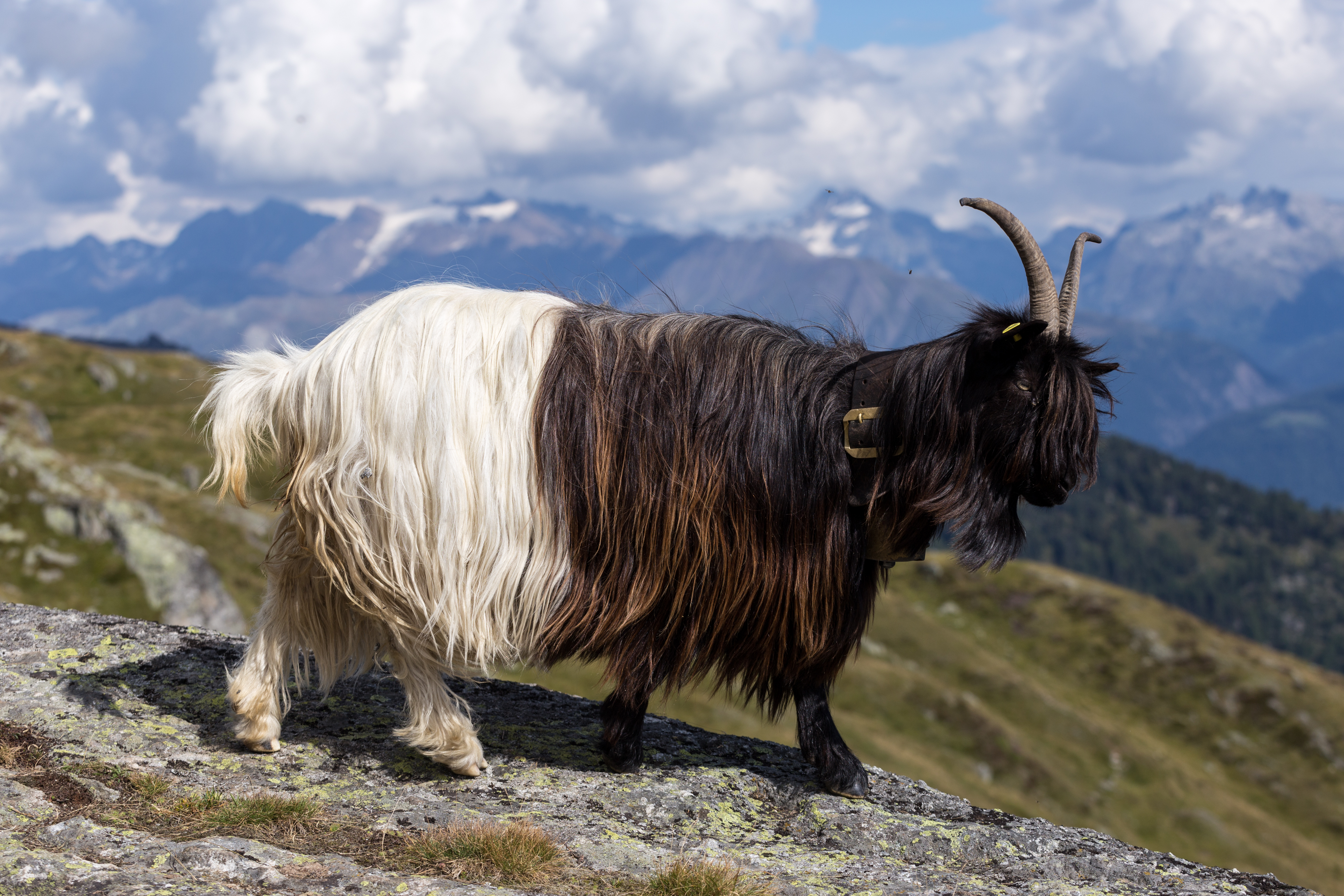
A Valais Blackneck in the high Alps

== Products ==
=== Cheeses ===
Cheese is a food of high nutritional value, composed of proteins, lipids, water and mineral salts, made from cow's milk (cattle), sheep's milk or goat's milk, to which has been added lactic ferments or rennet. In Switzerland, over 475 varieties of cheese are produced, in a wide variety of flavors, textures, and forms. Cow's milk is used in about 99 percent of the cheeses Switzerland produces. The remaining share is made up of sheep milk and goat milk.

Cheese is considered to be part of Switzerland's national heritage. It has become, together with chocolate, an archetypal Swiss food product. Swiss cheeses are known around the world for their flavour and authenticity. The export of these cheeses, some 40% of production in 2019, is also economically important for Switzerland. Each year, the Swiss themselves consume at least 22 kg of the dairy product per capita.

The best known Swiss cheeses are of the class known as Swiss-type cheeses, also known as Alpine cheeses, a group of hard or semi-hard cheeses with a distinct character. These notably include Emmental, Gruyère, Appenzeller and Sbrinz (the hardest), among many others. These are traditionally made in large rounds or "wheels" with a hard rind, to provide longevity to the shelf-life. They were also robust enough for transportation. Gruyère and Emmental are sometimes referred to as the "kings of cheeses".

Among notable hard but softer cheeses are Vacherin Fribourgeois and Raclette. A large number of other cheeses, called Mutschli are also made throughout Switzerland. In the same category is the Formaggella.

Soft cheeses notably include Vacherin Mont d'Or. Numerous local variants of Tommes are also made in western Switzerland.

Ziger or Sérac is the most notable example of fresh cheese. It is the by-product of the manufacture of cooked pressed cheeses, such as Gruyère or Emmental. It was also a staple food for mountain dwellers. Goat milk is often used for fresh cheeses, especially in southern Switzerland. Quark cheese is also very popular in Switzerland.

Cheese is commonly used in Swiss cuisine. Fondue and Raclette, which are melted cheese dishes, have become among the most popular dishes in the country.

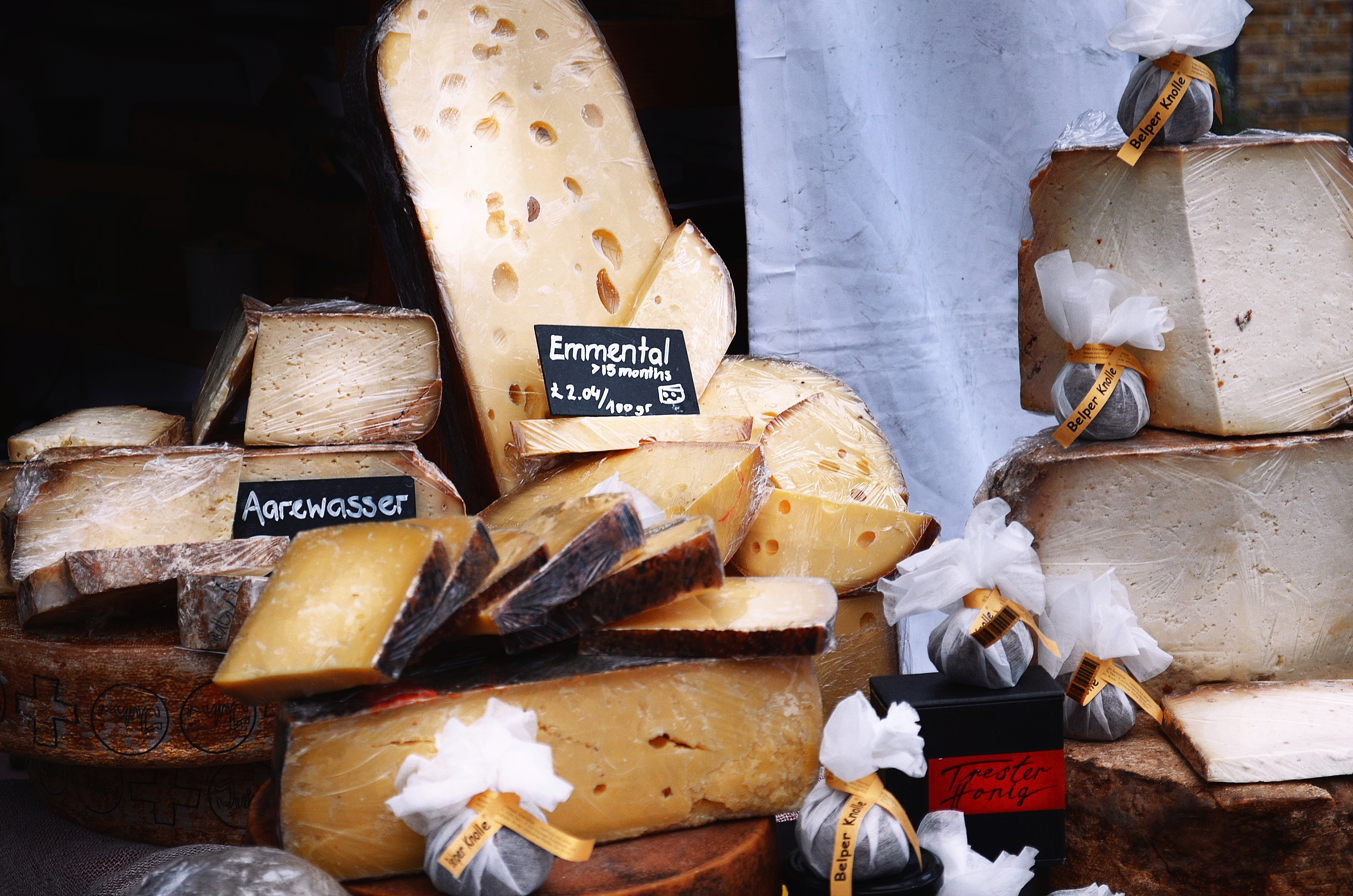
Cheeses from the canton of Bern

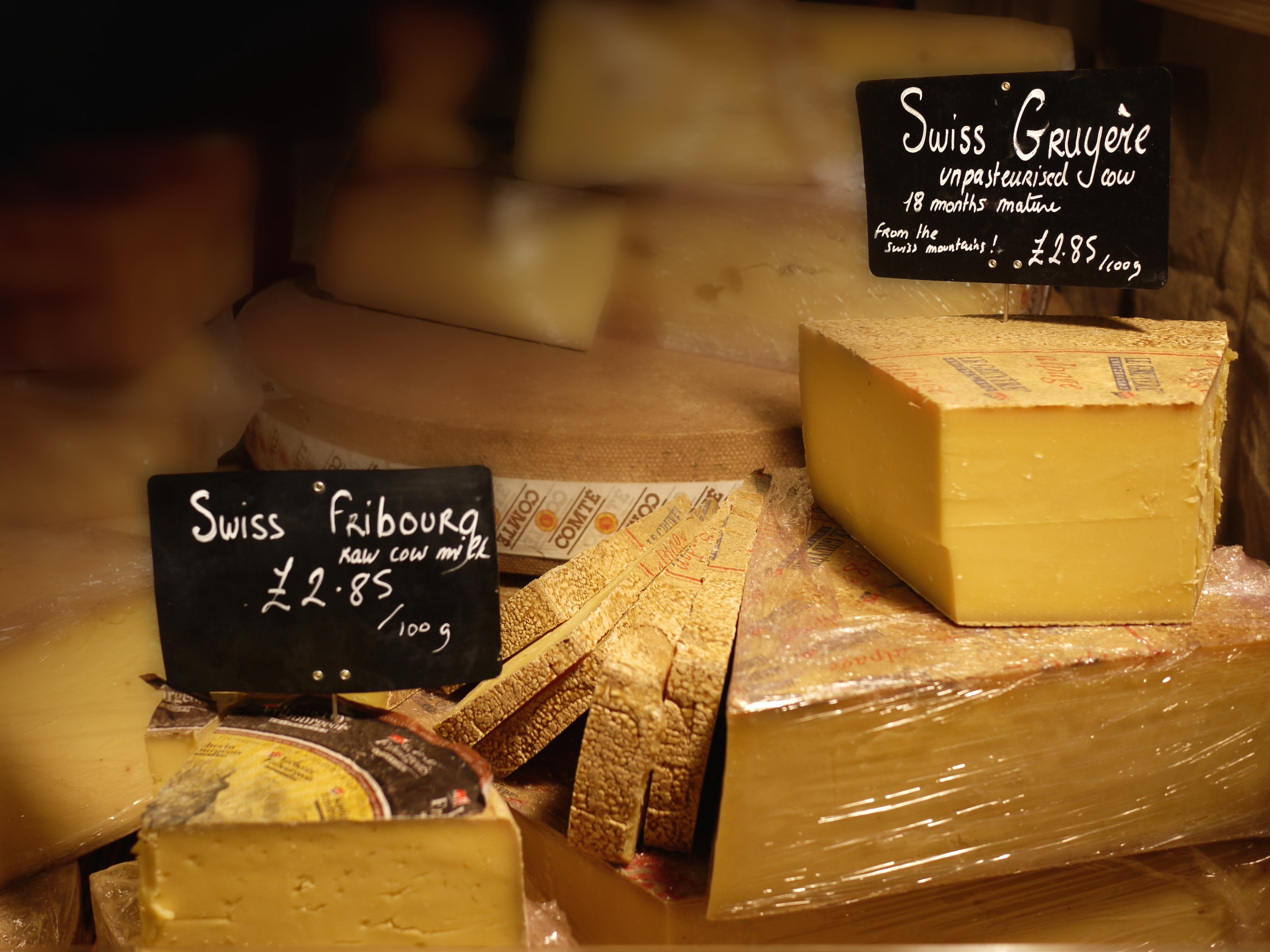
From western Switzerland

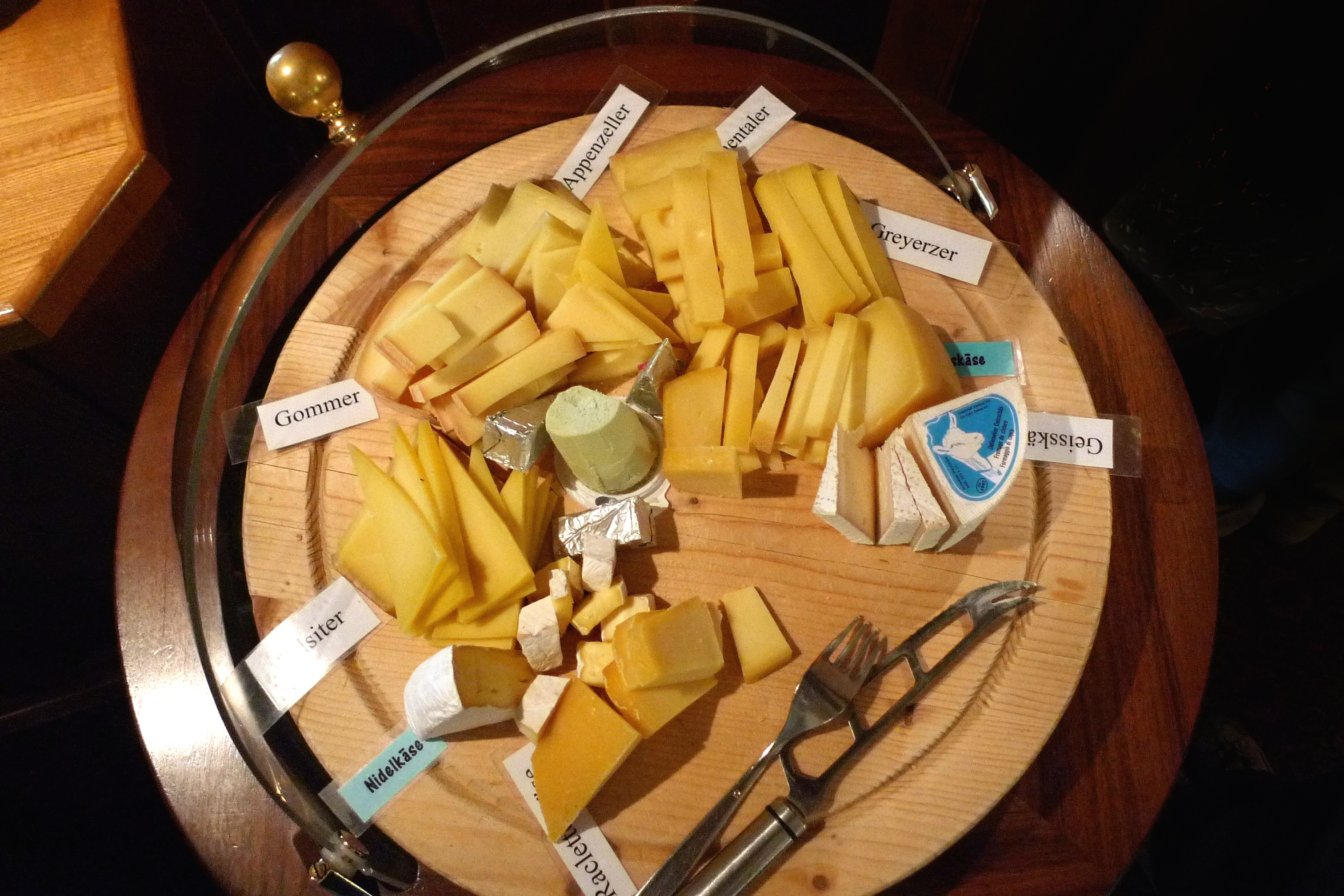
A wider assortment of cheeses

=== Other dairy products ===
Dairy products other than cheese are consumed on a daily basis in Switzerland. Swiss cuisine has integrated butter and cream as basic ingredients of many specialties. For breakfast, most Swiss enjoy buttered toasts with jam, and Muesli with either milk or yogurt. The Butterzopf is also one of the most popular breads in Switzerland.

Gruyère cream is a specific dairy product from the region of Gruyères. It is a type of double cream, and it is often served with meringues.

Milk has also become a major ingredient in the Swiss chocolate industry, since the invention of milk chocolate by Daniel Peter.

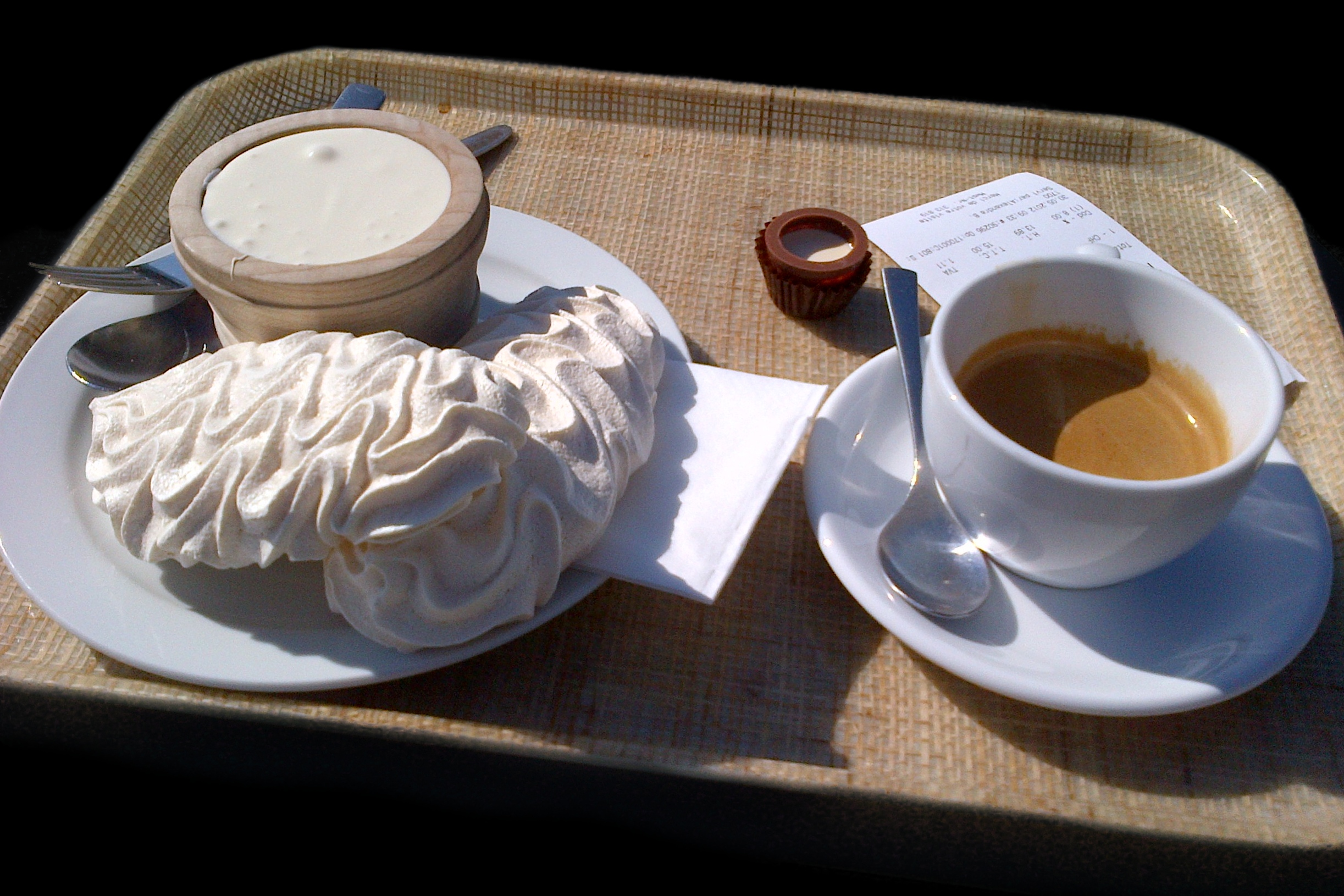
Gruyère cream

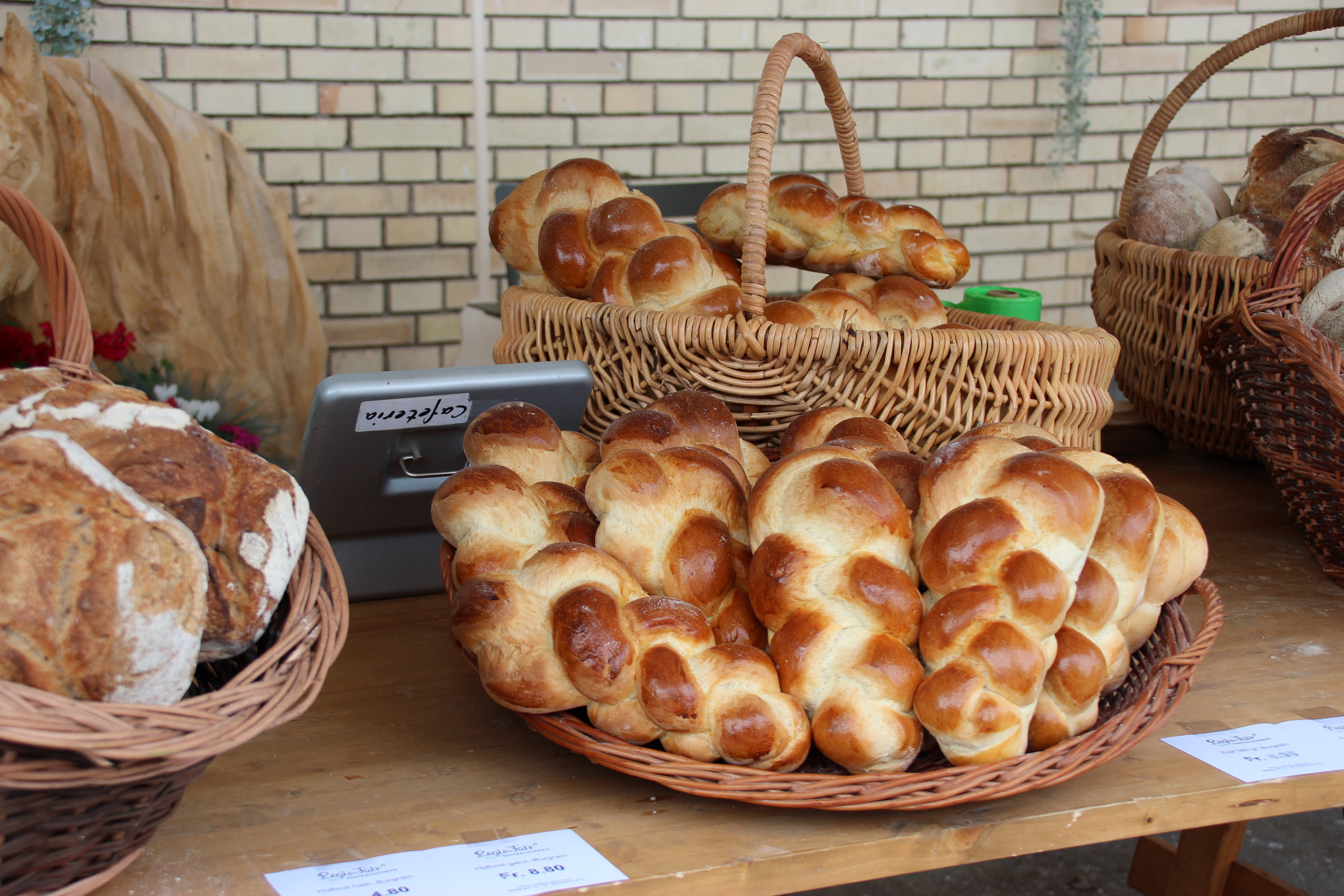
Butterzopf

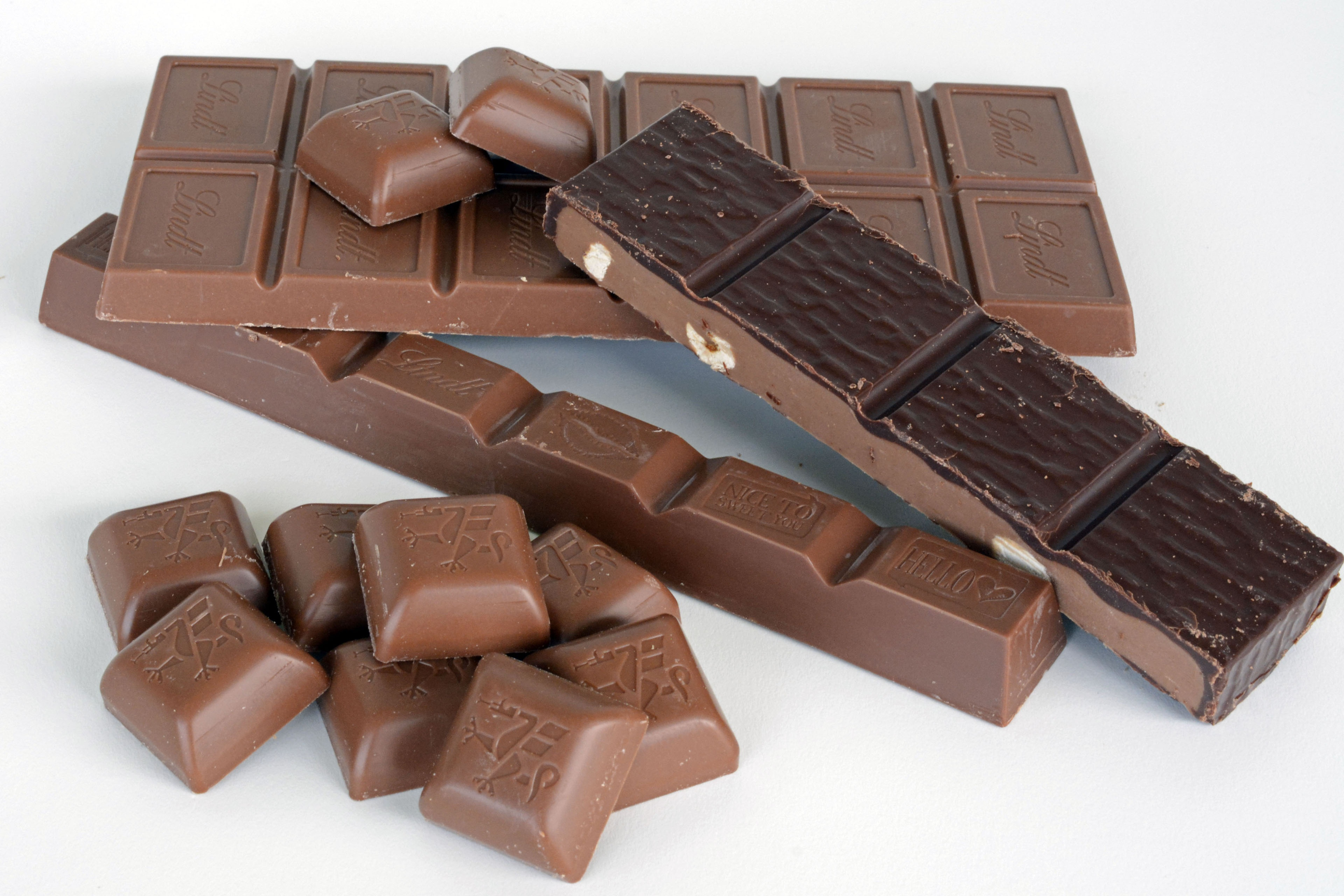
Milk chocolate

== Dairy industry ==
Swiss milk production represents CHF 2.1 billion per year, more than 20 percent of total agricultural production. The dairy industry is thus the most important branch of the Swiss food industry.

In 2011, out of nearly 3.5 million metric tons of milk, around 1.5 million were processed into cheese, 400'000 into drinking milk and 500'000 into butter. The remaining milk is processed into canned milk, consumer cream, yogurt and other dairy products. The four largest dairy processors in Switzerland are Emmi, Cremo, Hochdorf and Elsa (part of the Migros group).

== Show dairies ==
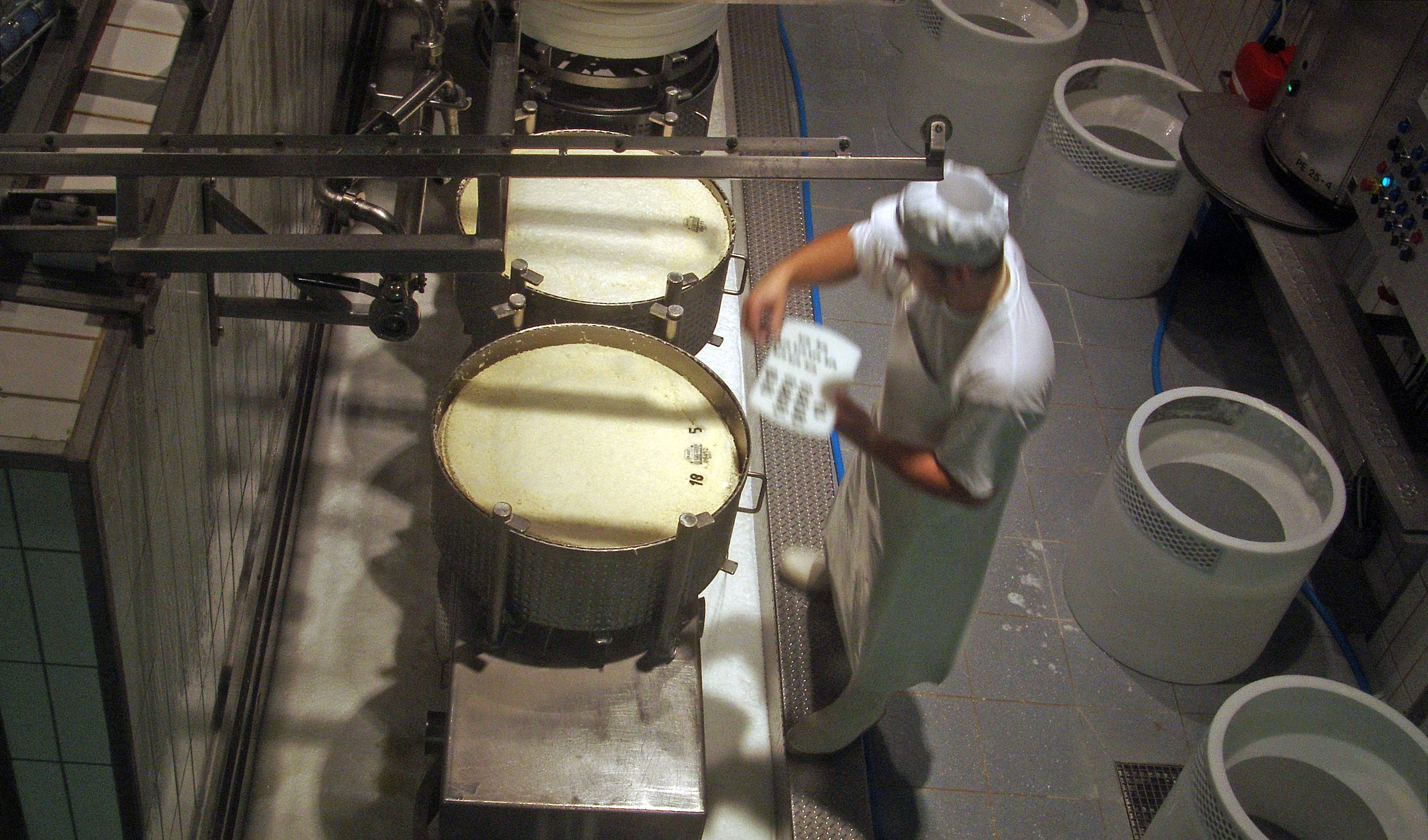
Schaukäserei (show dairy)

Some cheese dairies offer guided tours or have a so-called "show dairy" (Schaukäserei): Visitors can observe live the process of cheesemaking at the cheese dairy through windows. An article states that Emmentaler Schaukäserei, the main producer of Emmentaler cheese, has stopped the production of cheese as of March 11, 2025. In the process of ending cheese production, up to 12 people will be laid off. The main cause of Emmentaler Schaukäserei closing is that milk costs have risen sharply in recent years. Also, the producer of traditional Swiss Emmantal is struggling with declining sales.

== See also ==
- Swiss Cheese Union
- Agriculture in Switzerland
