= Pain de seigle valaisan =

Swiss rye bread

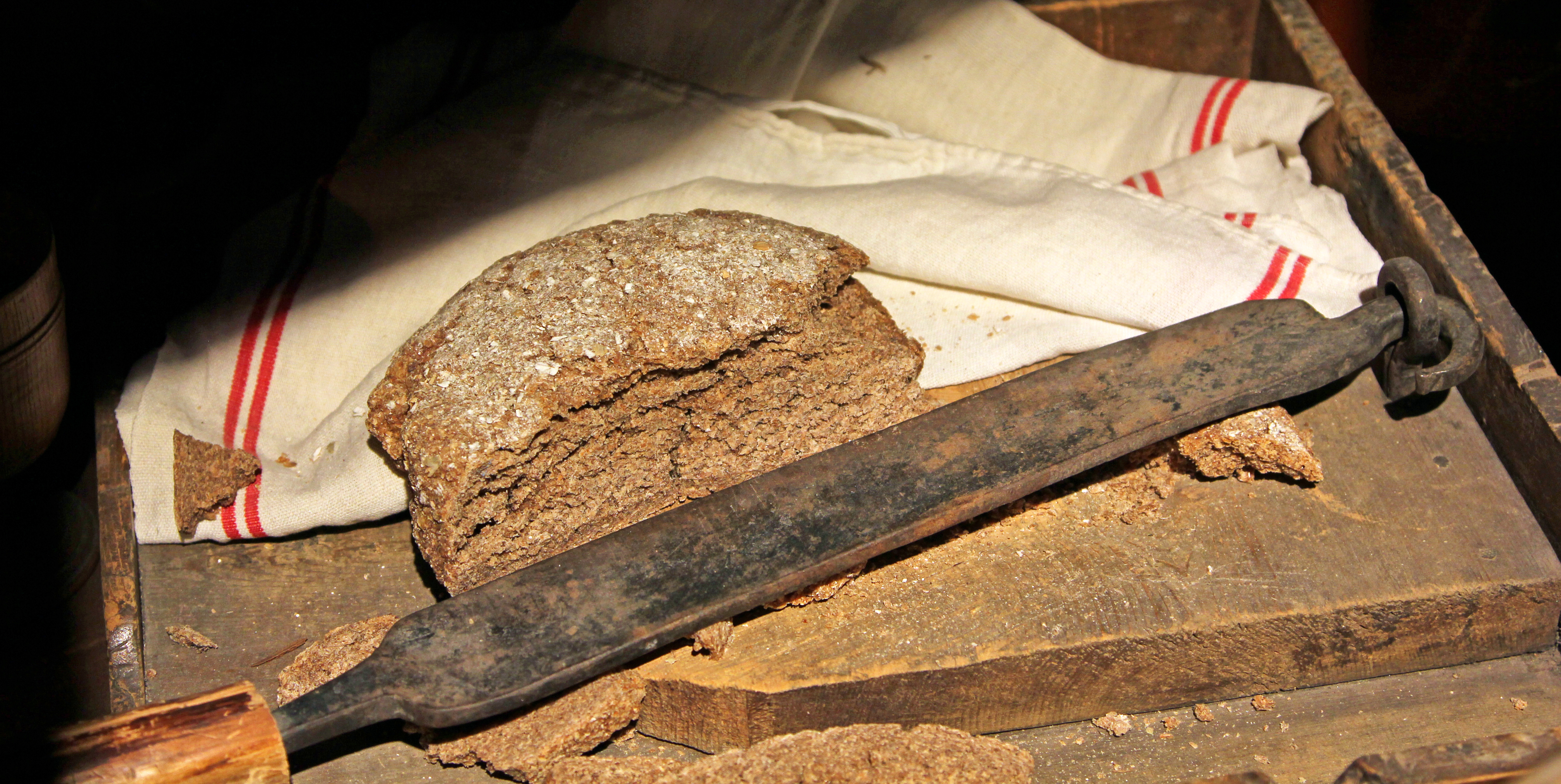
Pain de seigle valaisan in the Matterhorn Museum

Pain de seigle valaisan (French pronunciation: [pɛ̃ də sɛɡl valɛzɑ̃], lit. 'Valais rye bread') is a rye bread from Valais, Switzerland. It is recognized with an appellation d'origine protégée (AOP). It is often served with raclette cheese and charcuterie.

The history of pain de seigle valaisan begins in the Middle Ages; it was baked into bread in the European Alpine regions. The importance of rye bread in Valais is evidenced by records dating back to 1209. At that time, it was the main ingredient in the daily diet in the Valais villages. The oven, which was used for the collective production of bread in the village, was stoked only two or three times a year. Therefore, bakery products such as Valais rye bread had to be stored for a particularly long time.
