= Raclette du Valais =

Semi-hard cheese

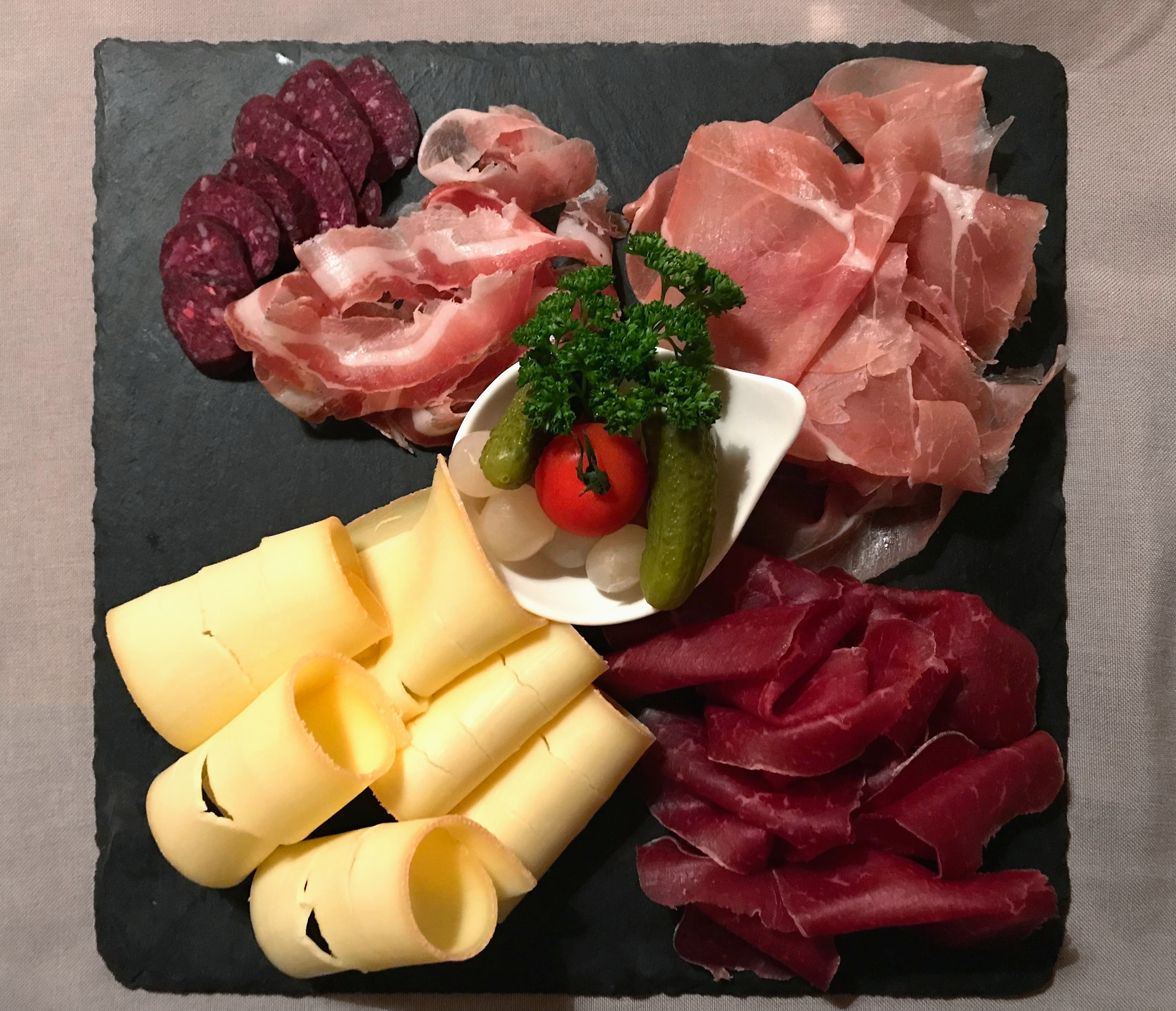
- The traditional Valais dish, consisting of various cured meats and Raclette (left)
- Country of origin: Switzerland
- Region: Valais
- Source of milk: Cows
- Pasteurised: No
- Texture: Semi-hard
- Aging time: 3-6 months
- Certification: AOC 2003-2013; AOP since 2013

Raclette du Valais (French pronunciation: [ʁaklɛt dy valɛ]) or Walliser Raclette (German) is a semi-hard Swiss cheese that is usually fashioned into a wheel of about 6 kg (13 lb). The Alpine cow milk-based dairy product is most commonly used for melting for the dish called raclette, but is also consumed as is.

Raclette cheese is native to the Canton of Valais and benefits from an AOP. Non-AOP versions are made in various regions and countries of the world, including Switzerland, France (Savoy, Franche-Comté, Auvergne, Brittany), Luxembourg, Austria, Germany, Finland, United Kingdom, Australia, Canada and the United States.

== See also ==
- Culinary Heritage of Switzerland
