= Swiss Cheese Union =

Marketing and trading organisation

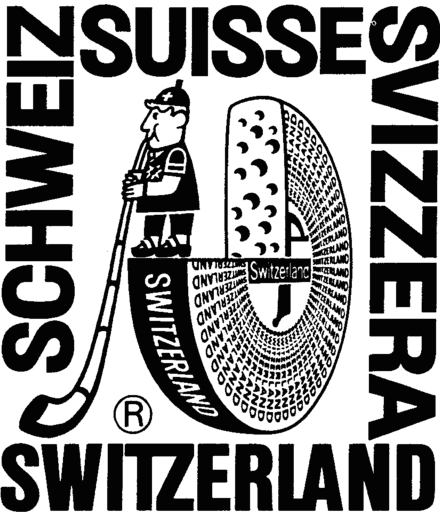
Official Seal of the Swiss Cheese Union integrates traditional iconography with the trade's primary product

The Swiss Cheese Union (German: Schweizerische Käseunion AG, pronounced [ˈʃvaɪtsərɪʃɛ ˈkɛːsɛ.uˌni̯oːn aːˈɡeː]) was a marketing and trading organization in Switzerland, which served as a cartel to control cheese production from 1914 to 1999. To this end, the Swiss Cheese Union mandated production be limited to only a few varieties, chiefly Gruyere and Emmental, and bought the entire production and distribution of cheese at prices set by the Swiss Federal Council. It also coordinated the national and international marketing for these varieties of cheese.

The Swiss Cheese Union was particularly successful in campaigning for cheese fondue, which became a very popular dish in Switzerland and abroad. It is now often considered to be the Swiss national dish. Before that, it was only a regional dish.

== History ==
=== 1914–1920s ===
Throughout the course of World War I, Switzerland remained neutral and maintained the health of its massive cheese production industry. Exports of the product suffered in part due to the devastation wrought upon customers in the surrounding countries; these numbers would remain low until after World War II. The war exacerbated this further as a lack of hay and fodder to use as feed for dairy animals showed sharp decreases in production.

In an effort to combat this slump in exports, cheese producers were determined to develop strict non-compete guidelines, establishing a cartel that became known as the Swiss Cheese Union. According to journalist Robert Smith, "The union set the price for milk. It told dairymen how much milk to produce and who they could sell it to. They told the cheesemakers how much cheese to make, and then set the prices for the cheese. And it was all so complicated, this cheese business, that they actually narrowed down the number of cheeses that people could produce. Switzerland used to make over 1,000 different kinds of cheeses; the Cheese Union supported seven."

=== Inter-War Period ===
The Swiss Cheese Union's success in controlling production soon presented a problem: overproduction of cheese in a saturated, stagnant market. Initially, the Swiss Cheese Union was able to float the dairy market by buying cheese from the milk association at fixed prices and then reselling the cheese to itself, but the logic of this was so dizzying that it could not be the final answer.

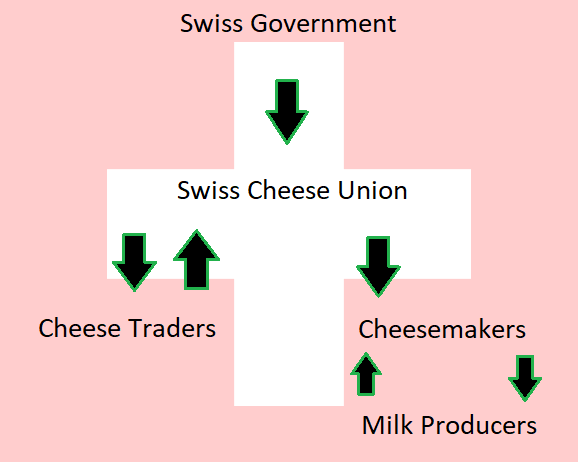

A more long-term solution presented itself in the form of fondue. According to former director of the Musee Gruerien Isabelle Raboud-Schuele, "Up until 1930, fondue was essentially only known in the French-speaking part of Switzerland but thereafter it became popular throughout Switzerland, to the point of becoming a national dish. This was due to the success of intensive campaigns to promote cheese, led by the Swiss Union for Marketing Cheese in the 1930s. Cheese production exceeded consumption and hence in order to expand the market for this former export, the Swiss needed to be convinced to eat more cheese."

Though marketed by the Swiss Cheese Union as an Alpine specialty, the dish did not originate in the mountains. Alpine cheese-making was limited to the summer months, and fondue was thus in the 18th century eaten only by upper class households in small towns in the Jura region and lowland Switzerland; cheese making spread throughout the country in the following century and became easier to make year-round thanks to advances in equipment. Alpine-cheese making could not keep up with the strong competition, and the economy of mountain-produced cheese weakened. According to Dominik Flammer, the author of Swiss cheese: origins, traditional cheese varieties and new creations, typical families might have the dish only a few times a year.

These facts did not stop the Swiss Cheese Union from fabricating an almost infectious enthusiasm for fondue in its marketing materials, drawing on a recipe requiring vast amounts of Swiss cheese and steeped in a narrative of tradition. The Swiss Cheese Union used iconography known around the world to promote the dish, invoking Heidi (the stories of whom had been translated into many languages at this point) to underline the wholesomeness and authenticity of the Swiss dish. Posters showcasing rain or snow as “fondue weather” reinforced the notion that fondue delivers a feeling of warmth in guests, and the recipes and tips were given on how to prepare fondue for anywhere from four to one hundred people, encouraging conspicuous consumption of the mass produced product.

=== Rebellion ===
A rebel cheesemaker named Sepp Barmettler strove against this near-universal acceptance of cheese restrictions and aimed to add the Parmesan-like Sbrinz cheese to the list of allowed cheeses. After eight years of applications and appeals to the Swiss Cheese Union, his request was denied. In a letter to Barmettler, no specific reason was given for the denial, but it was noted to Barmettler that "you do not fit into the envisaged structures." Nevertheless, Barmettler continued to produce small, soft cheeses stanser fladen, selling them directly to small vendors like hotels and small restaurants rather than to the larger distributors that would have caught the attention of the cartel. After the collapse of the cartel, an explosion of new cheeses from Switzerland came onto the market, from recreations of old recipes to continuations of classics like Sepp helped keep alive.

=== Decline of the Union ===
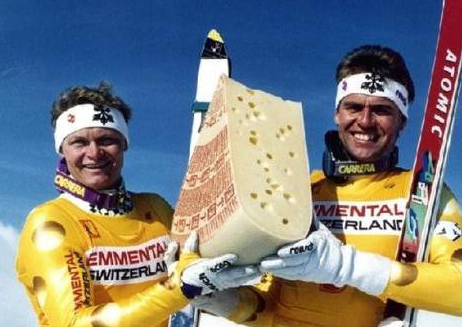
Union-sponsored skiers

As the country's reputation shifted from that of a dairy farming nation raising cows to one peopled by scientists and engineers, concern grew over the vast sums of taxpayer money pumped into the dairy industry. In the 1960s and 1970s, the dairy industry purportedly cost the Swiss government more than the whole cost of the army of Switzerland.

The Swiss Cheese Union sponsored the 1992-1993 Swiss National Ski Team. The team wore yellow ski suits with simulated cheese holes.

After corruption charges were leveled against a number of the Swiss Cheese Union officials, the union was disbanded by the late 1990s. Dairy subsidies continued, but competition between cheese makers was reintroduced, causing prices to plummet.

== See also ==
- Swiss cheeses and dairy products
