= Theodor Amstad =

Swiss Jesuit priest in Brazil

- Born: 9 November 1851; Beckenried, Nidwalden, Switzerland
- Died: 7 November 1938 (aged 86); São Leopoldo, Brazil
- Occupation: Jesuit priest
- Known for: Founding mutual aid organizations for German-speaking Catholic immigrants in Brazil
- Parent: Joseph Mariä Amstad
- Relatives: Josef Mariä Amstad (brother); Eduard Amstad (brother)

Theodor Amstad (9 November 1851 – 7 November 1938) was a Swiss Jesuit priest who dedicated most of his life to serving German-speaking Catholic immigrants in Brazil. He founded several mutual aid organizations for settlers and edited German-language journals.

== Early life and education ==
Amstad was born on 9 November 1851 in Beckenried, Nidwalden, to Joseph Mariä Amstad, an ensign of Nidwalden. He was the brother of Josef Mariä Amstad and Eduard Amstad, who became president of the cantonal court.

After attending the gymnasium in Feldkirch, Austria, from 1864 to 1870, Amstad entered the Jesuit novitiate (1870–1872). He pursued classical studies and philosophy from 1872 to 1877, followed by theology from 1881 to 1885. He was ordained a priest in 1883.

== Career ==
Between his philosophical and theological studies, Amstad taught at Feldkirch in 1877–1878 and served as secretary in Wyandsrade, Netherlands, from 1878 to 1881.

In 1885, Amstad was sent to Brazil, where he would remain until 1934, ministering to German-speaking Catholic immigrants. During this period, he founded several mutual aid organizations to support settlers: the Peasant Association (Bauernverein) in 1900, Raiffeisen-type cooperative banks starting in 1902, and the Catholic People's Association (Katholischer Volksverein) in 1912. He also served as editor of German-language journals.

== Later life and honors ==
Amstad was awarded the Cross of Honor of the Red Cross in 1936. He died on 7 November 1938 in São Leopoldo, Brazil, just two days before his 87th birthday.

== Works ==
- Jahrhundertbuch der deutschen Einwanderung in Rio Grande do Sul (1924)
- Erinnerungen aus meinem Leben (1940)

== Bibliography ==
- Wymann, E. Theodor Amstad von Beckenried. 1939.
- Nidwaldner Volksblatt, 4 June, 8 June, and 11 June 1977.
