= Bellelay Abbey =

- Bellelay Abbey

- Location within Switzerland
- Interactive map of Bellelay Abbey

Monastery information
- Order: Premonstratensian
- Established: 1140
- Disestablished: 1798

Architecture
- Functional status: Cantonal Psychiatric Clinic
- Heritage designation: Swiss Inventory of Cultural Property of National and Regional Significance
- Architect: Franz Beer
- Style: Vorarlberg Baroque

Site
- Coordinates: 47°15′50″N 7°10′07″E
- Public access: yes

Bellelay Abbey is a former Premonstratensian monastery in the Bernese Jura in Switzerland, now a psychiatric clinic. It is a heritage site of national significance and the entire former Abbey complex is part of the Inventory of Swiss Heritage Sites.

== History ==
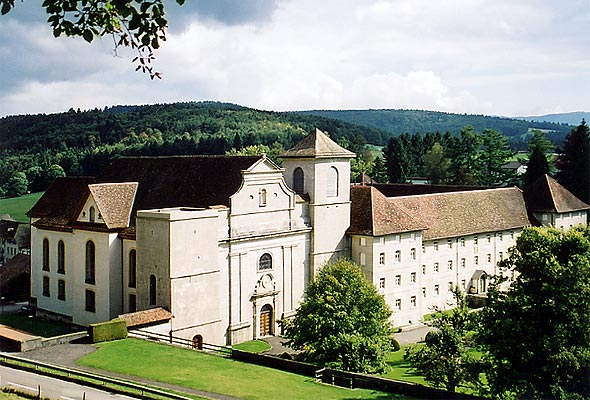
Bellelay Abbey complex

Arms of Bellelay

Aerial view (1953)

According to the legend, the monastery was founded in 1136 by Siginand, prior of the abbey of Moutier-Grandval, who got lost in the deep forest of the High Jura while hunting a wild boar and was unable to find his way out. He vowed to found a monastery if he managed to return safely to Moutier, which he did four days later. To the monastery he founded in accordance with his vow he gave the name of "belle laie" ("laie" is a female wild boar).

According to other sources, the monastery was probably founded as a result of the influence of the Bishop of Basel on the south-west border of the diocese of Basel with the territory of the Abbot of Moutier-Grandval.

The foundation was confirmed by Pope Innocent II in 1142. There are numerous spelling variations from the early years of the monastery: Balelaia, Belelagia, Belelai, Belilaia, Bellale, Bella Lagia, Bellelagia and Bellilagia. The name comes from the Vulgar Latin bella lagia ("beautiful forest").

The abbey possessed various estates widely scattered. It was the mother-house of several other foundations, including Grandgourt Priory, Gottstatt Abbey and Himmelspforte Abbey at Grenzach-Wyhlen in Baden-Württemberg.

Bellelay was under the authority of the diocese of Basel, but operated as an independent lordship under the terms of a protection contract agreed with Bern and Solothurn (by 1414 at the latest) and also with Biel in 1516.

Although the abbot had the right of the low justice in the abbey's immediate territory, and was awarded the right to the use of the ring, the mitre and the cross at the Council of Constance in 1414, it does not seem that Bellelay was ever an Imperial abbey.

The buildings were ransacked during the Swabian War in 1499. During the Protestant Reformation some of the residents converted to the new faith. However, thanks to the treaty with Solothurn the monastery was spared the effects of the Thirty Years' War. The abbey reached its golden age in the 18th century as a renowned place of education for the sons of European nobility. During the 18th century the monastery buildings were rebuilt and a new church building was dedicated in 1714. The monastery university opened in 1772 and by 1779 it had 62 pupils from throughout Europe. A new dormitory wing was added in 1782 to accommodate the growing student population and by 1797 there were about 100 students at Bellelay.

== Dissolution ==
In 1797 the buildings were occupied by French troops and secularised. The precious furnishings were sold at this time – an altar from Bellelay, for example, is now to be found in the parish church of Our Lady of the Assumption in Saignelégier.

In the 19th century the monastery premises were used as a watch factory, then as a brewery and finally as a glass factory. In 1890 the Canton of Bern acquired the site, from which time the monastery buildings have been used as a psychiatric clinic.

Since the end of the 1960s the premises have also been used for concerts and exhibitions by the Fondation de l'Abbatiale de Bellelay.

== Architecture ==
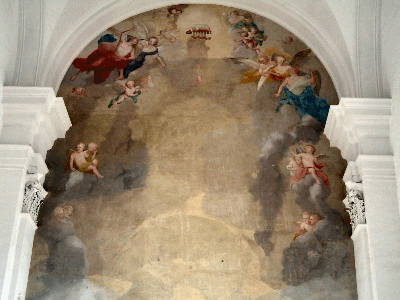
Painting on stucco

The present structure of the abbey church of the Assumption was built by Franz Beer on the Vorarlberg Baroque model between 1708 and 1714. The church has two towers on the west front which formerly had onion domes. The interior is decorated with painted stucco by the Wessobrunn School, created in 1713. The other monastery buildings in the Baroque style are also from the 18th century.

== Tête de Moine ==
Bellelay Abbey is the home of the cheese Tête de Moine, first made by the monks in the 12th century.

== List of Abbots of Bellelay ==
1. Geroldus 1142–1180
2. Ludovicus 1187–1202
3. Adam 1195
4. Richardus 1202–1237
5. Henricus I of Soulce 1237–1256
6. Jacobus I von Wetterau 1256–1258
7. Conradus 1258–1270
8. Name unknown, possibly died 1276
9. Petrus I of Varres 1289–1296
10. Burchardus of Boécourt 1298–1316
11. Lambertus 1316–1326
12. Petrus II de Sancey 1326–1336
13. Henricus II de Bassecourt 1337–1350
14. Petrus III de Vannes 1350–1354
15. Jacobus II de Séprais 1365–1374
16. Joannes III de Pontenet 1374–1398
17. Joannes IV Donzelat 1398–1401
18. Henricus III Nerr 1401–1418
19. Heinzmann (Henricus IV) Girardin 1418–1426
20. Joannes V de Chatelat 1426–1434
21. Petrus IV Martini 1434–1438
22. Heinzmann (Henricus V) 1438–1448
23. Joannes VI Rier 1448–1456
24. Joannes VII Gruel or Grier 1456–1483
25. Joannes VIII Barth 1483–1490
26. Joannes IX Brullard 1490–1508
27. Nicolaus I Schnell 1508–1530
28. Joannes X Gogniat 1530–1553
29. Servatius Fridez 1553–1561
30. Antonius Fottel 1561–1574
31. Joannes XI Simon 1574–1579
32. Werner Spiessbrecher (Brieselance) 1579–1612
33. David Juillerat 1612–1637
34. Joannes XII Petrus Cuénat 1637–1666
35. Joanns XIII Georgius Schwaller 1666–1691
36. Norbertus Périat 1691–1692
37. Fridericus de Staal 1692–1706
38. Joannes XIV Georgius Voirol 1706–1719
39. Joannes XV Sémon 1719–1743
40. Gregorius Joliat 1743–1771
41. Nicolaus II Deluce 1771–1784
42. Ambrosius Monnin 1784–1807

== Sources ==
- "Bellelay Abbey" in German, French and Italian in the online Historical Dictionary of Switzerland.
- The reproduction of the Bossard organ from 1721 by Kuhn Organ Builders Ltd.
- Fondation de l'abbatiale de Bellelay (in French and German)
- Website source of list of abbots
