= L'Etivaz =

Swiss hard cheese similar to Gruyère

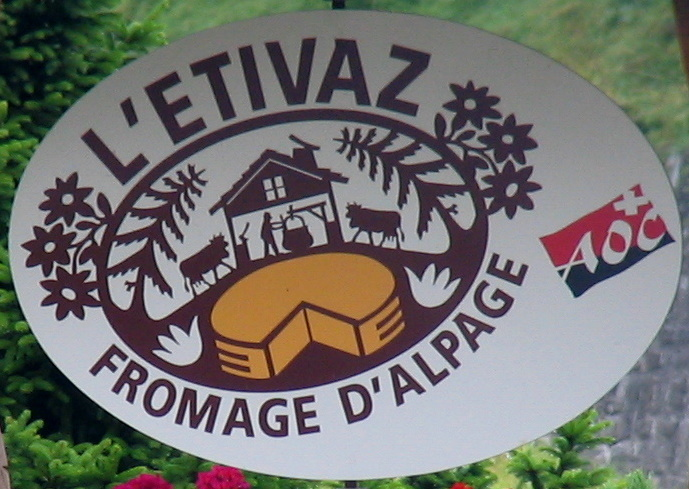
Logo of L'Étivaz

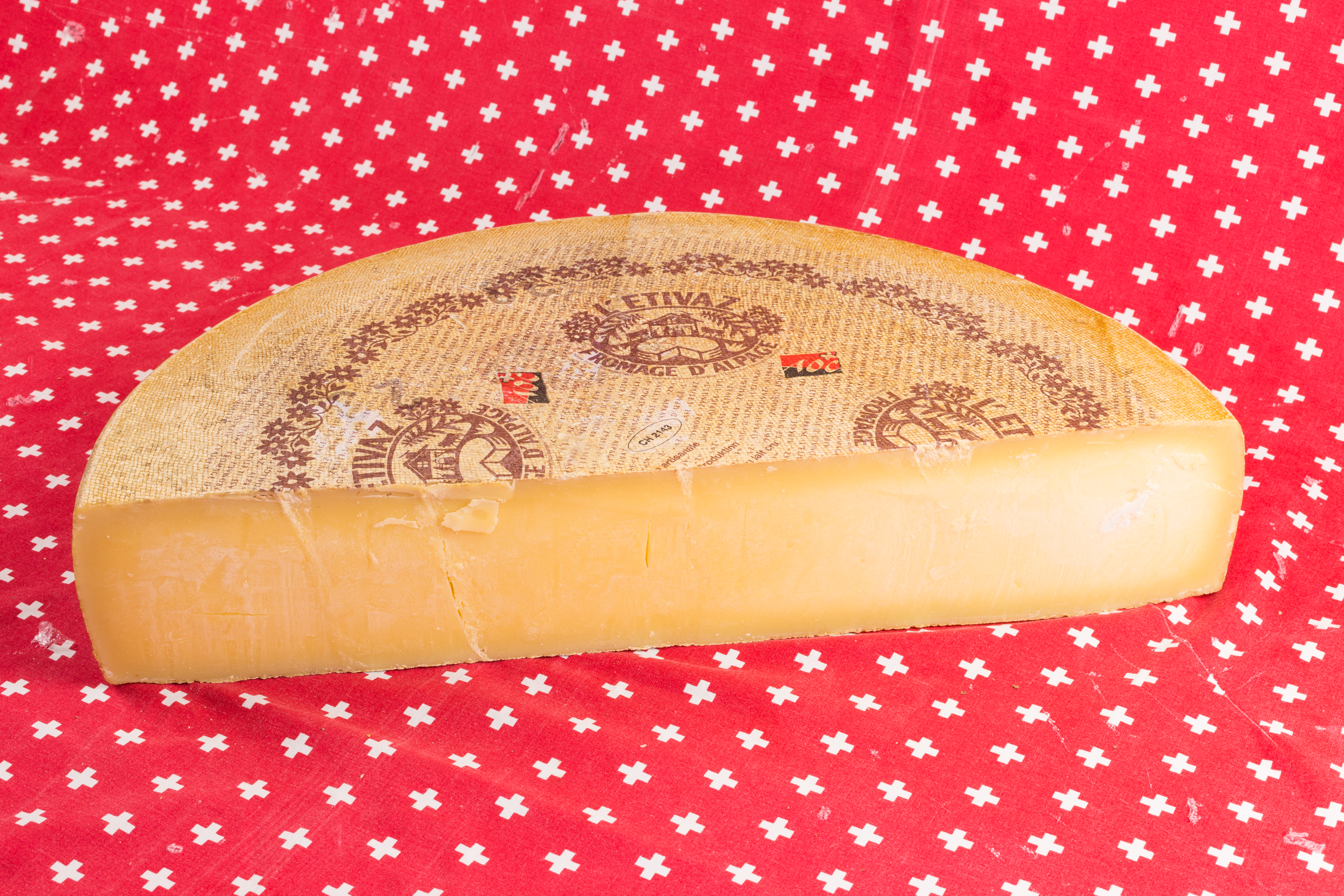
Round piece of L'Étivaz cheese

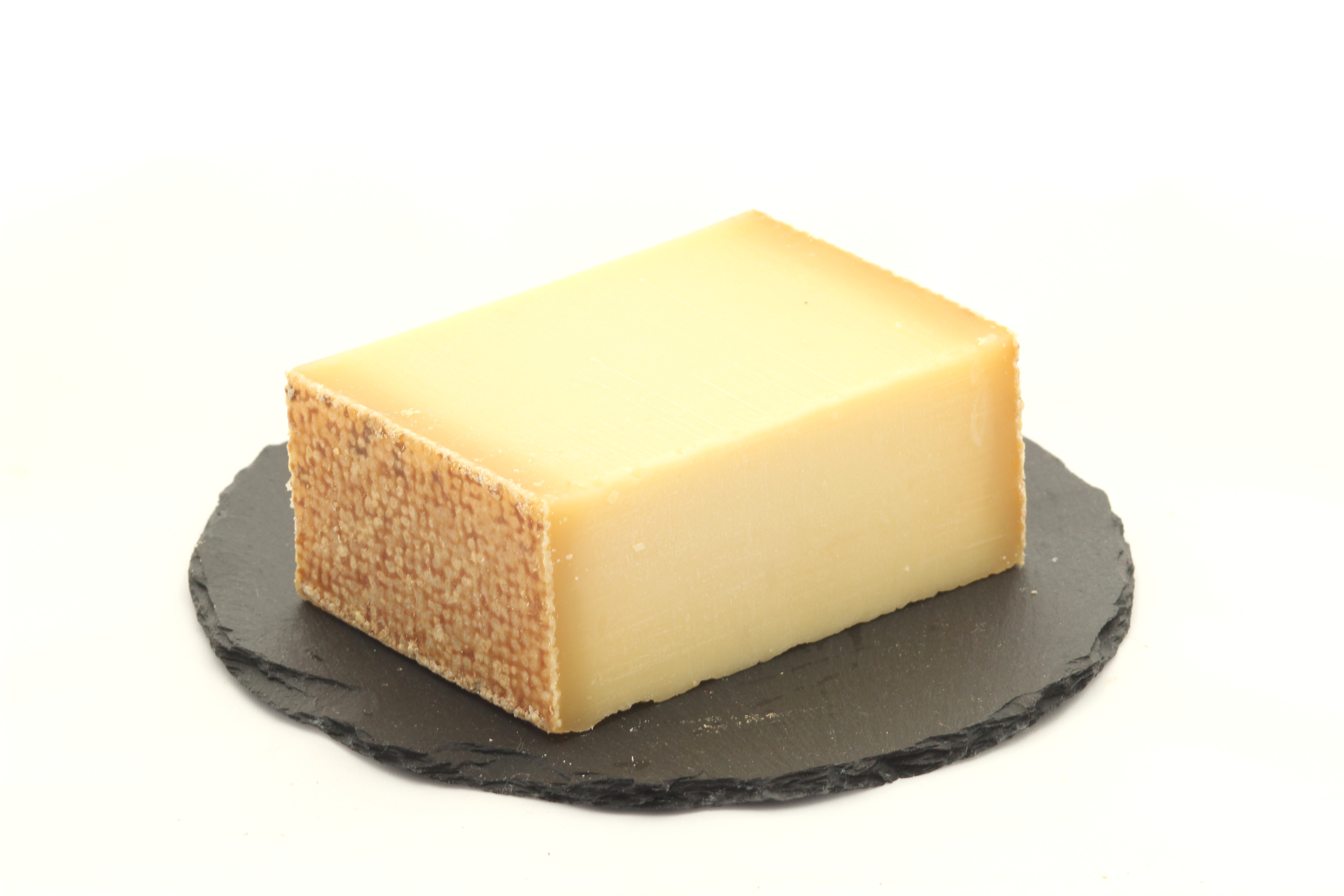
Small piece of L'Étivaz cheese

L'Étivaz is a hard Swiss cheese made from raw cow's milk. It is classified as a Swiss-type or Alpine cheese, and is very similar to Gruyère surchoix in taste.

The cheese originates from and is named for L'Etivaz, a hamlet in the municipality of Château-d'Œx in the canton of Vaud, Switzerland, located in the southwestern Swiss Alps, just under the Col des Mosses. The cheese is produced in the communes of Château-d'Œx, Rougemont, Rossinière, Ormont-Dessous, Ormont-Dessus, Leysin, Corbeyrier, Villeneuve, Ollon and Bex.

== History ==
In the 1930s, a group of 76 Gruyère producing families felt that government regulations were allowing cheesemakers to compromise the qualities that made good Gruyère so special. They withdrew from the government's Gruyère program, and "created" their own cheese - L'Etivaz - named for the village around which they all lived. They founded a cooperative in 1932, and the first cheese cellars were built in 1934.

== Fabrication ==
L'Etivaz is made essentially as Gruyère was 100 years ago. It is made only when the cows are doing their summer grazing in Alpine pastures. It must be made in traditional copper cauldrons, and only over old-style, open wood fires. The resulting cheese is a bit creamier and less sharp than Antique Gruyère, yet smooth and flavorful. L'Etivaz has a firm texture with a fruity, slightly nutty flavor, which varies depending on the soil of the different pastures. It is yellow ivory in color and slightly sticky due to its saltiness. It is aged for 5 to 13 months before it is eaten.

The cheese is formed into a wheel, 40 to 65 cm (16 to 26 in) in diameter with a thickness of 10 cm (3.9 in) and weighing from 20 to 50 kg (44 to 110 lb). Originally, the cheese had a large distribution of tiny holes; however, the modern cheese rarely shows holes. One may see the occasional horizontal fissure under the rind. It is eaten at the end of a meal with raisins or fresh figs. Another excellent accompaniment is nuts and slices of pears.

== Certification ==
In 2000, the cheese L'Etivaz was the first Swiss product other than wine to obtain an appellation d'origine contrôlée (AOC). In 2013, the certification was replaced by the appellation d'origine protégée (AOP).
