= Raclette =

Swiss dish of melted cheese

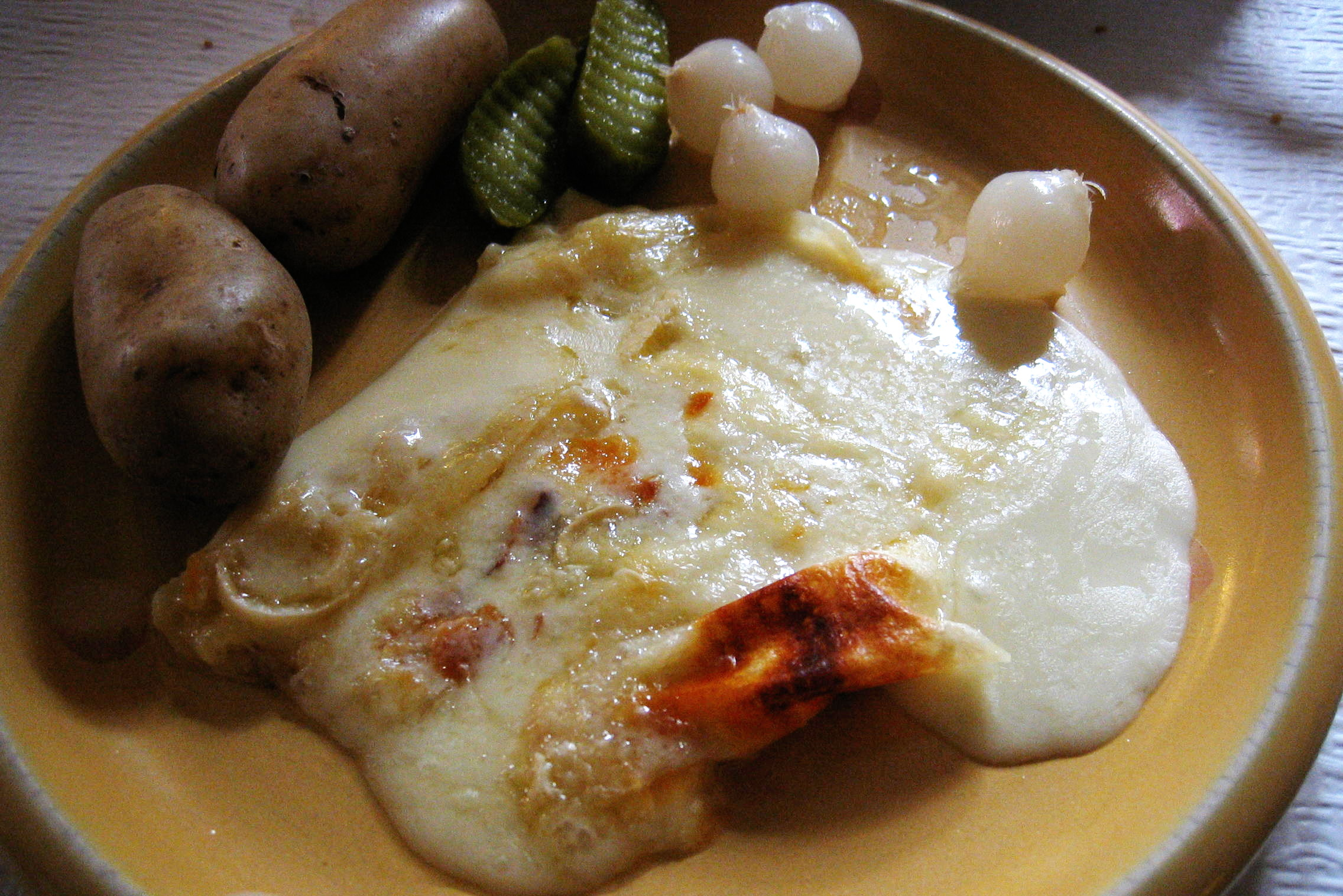
Raclette with boiled potatoes, pickles and onions

Raclette (/rəˈklɛt/, French: [ʁaklɛt]) is a dish of Swiss origin, also popular in other countries, based on heating cheese and scraping off the melted part, then typically served with boiled potatoes. Raclette is historically a dish originating from the canton of Valais in Switzerland. This cheese from Valais benefits from an AOP. Raclette cheese is also a Swiss-type cheese marketed specifically to be used for this dish.

Raclette is also served as street food, but often with bread instead of potatoes.

== History ==
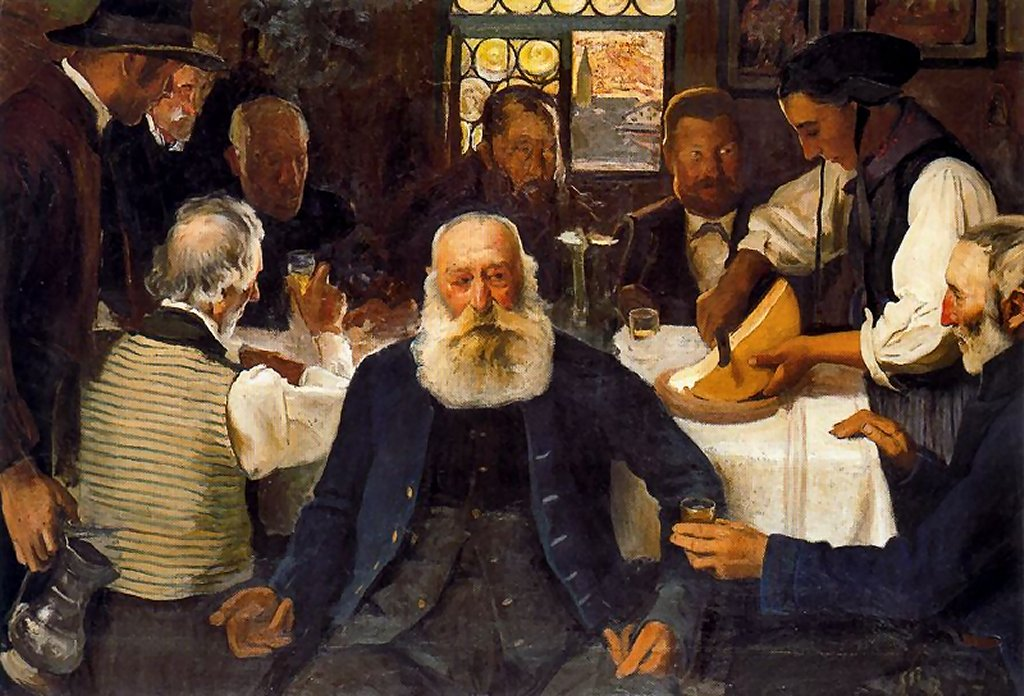
A depiction of raclette being served in a 1903 painting by Ernest Biéler

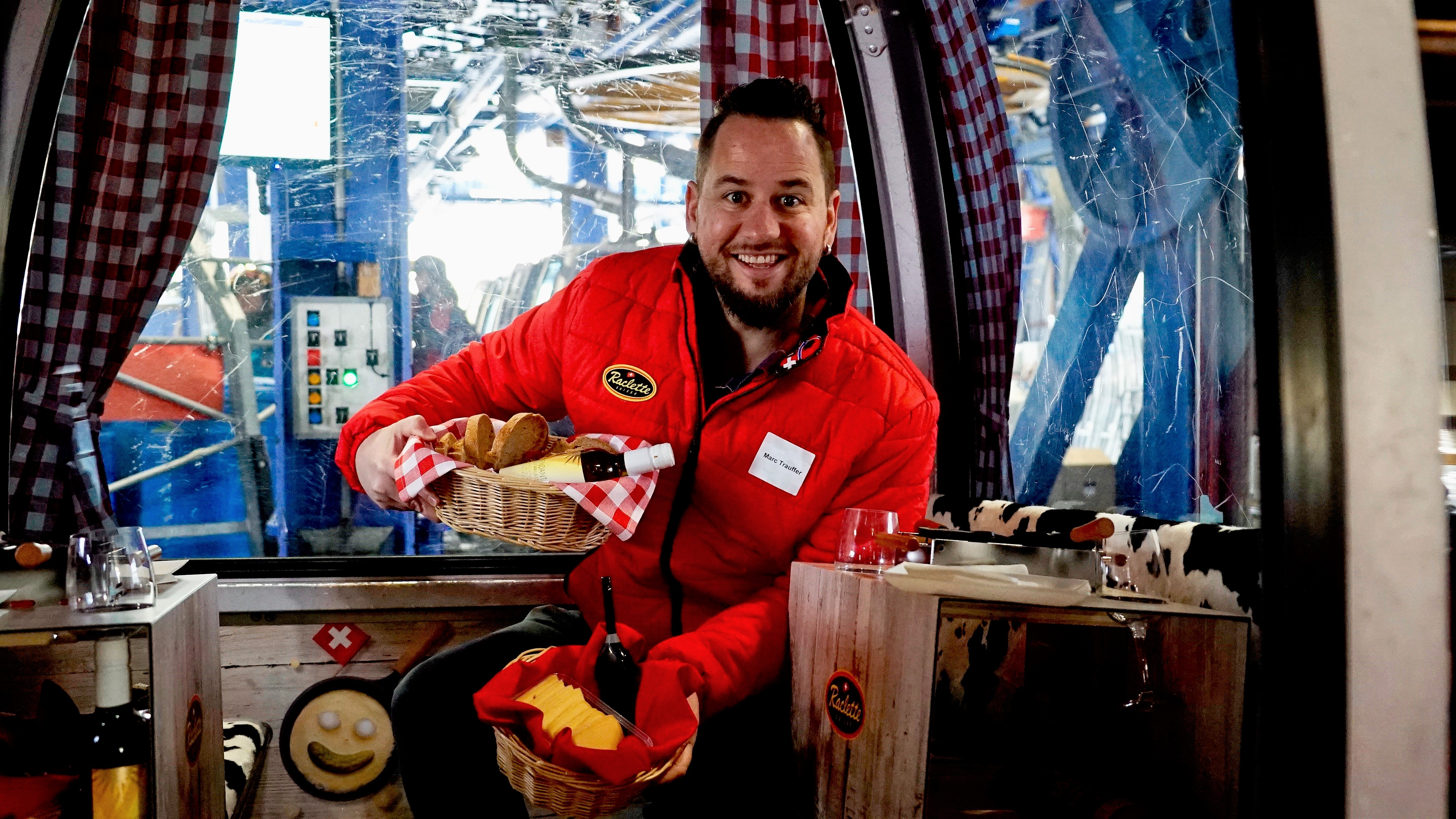
Raclette is a dish associated with Alpine culture (here served in a gondola lift in Grindelwald).

Dishes of melted cheese were mentioned in medieval texts from Swiss convents as early as 1291. Melted cheese was originally consumed by peasants in the mountainous Alpine regions of the cantons of Valais and Fribourg (Switzerland), and Savoie and Haute-Savoie (France). It was then known in the German-speaking part of Switzerland as Bratchäs or Bratkäse, "roasted cheese". Traditionally, cow herders carried cheese with them when they were moving cows to or from pastures up in the mountains. In the evening, the cheese would be placed next to a campfire for softening, then scraped onto bread. Melting raclette-type cheese in front of a fire is attested in Valais as early as 1574. Since 1875, the French term raclette is commonly used for this dish. At the 1909 Cantonal Exhibition of Sion, raclette was promoted as a national dish of Valais. Raclette eventually gained national (and international) popularity from the 1964 National Exhibition.

In Valais, raclette is typically served with potatoes, cornichons (fermented, pickled cucumbers), pickled onions, black tea, other warm beverages, or Fendant wine. A popular French option is to serve it with white wine, such as Savoy wine, but Riesling and pinot gris are also common. Traditionally, it is consumed with black tea, since a warm beverage is considered to aid digestion.

== Dish ==
Raclette is a dish native to parts of Switzerland. The raclette cheese round is heated, either in front of a fire or by a special machine, then scraped onto diners' plates.

A modern way of serving raclette otherwise, known as raclonette, involves an electric table-top grill with small pans, known as coupelles, in which slices of raclette cheese are melted.

Examples of raclettes

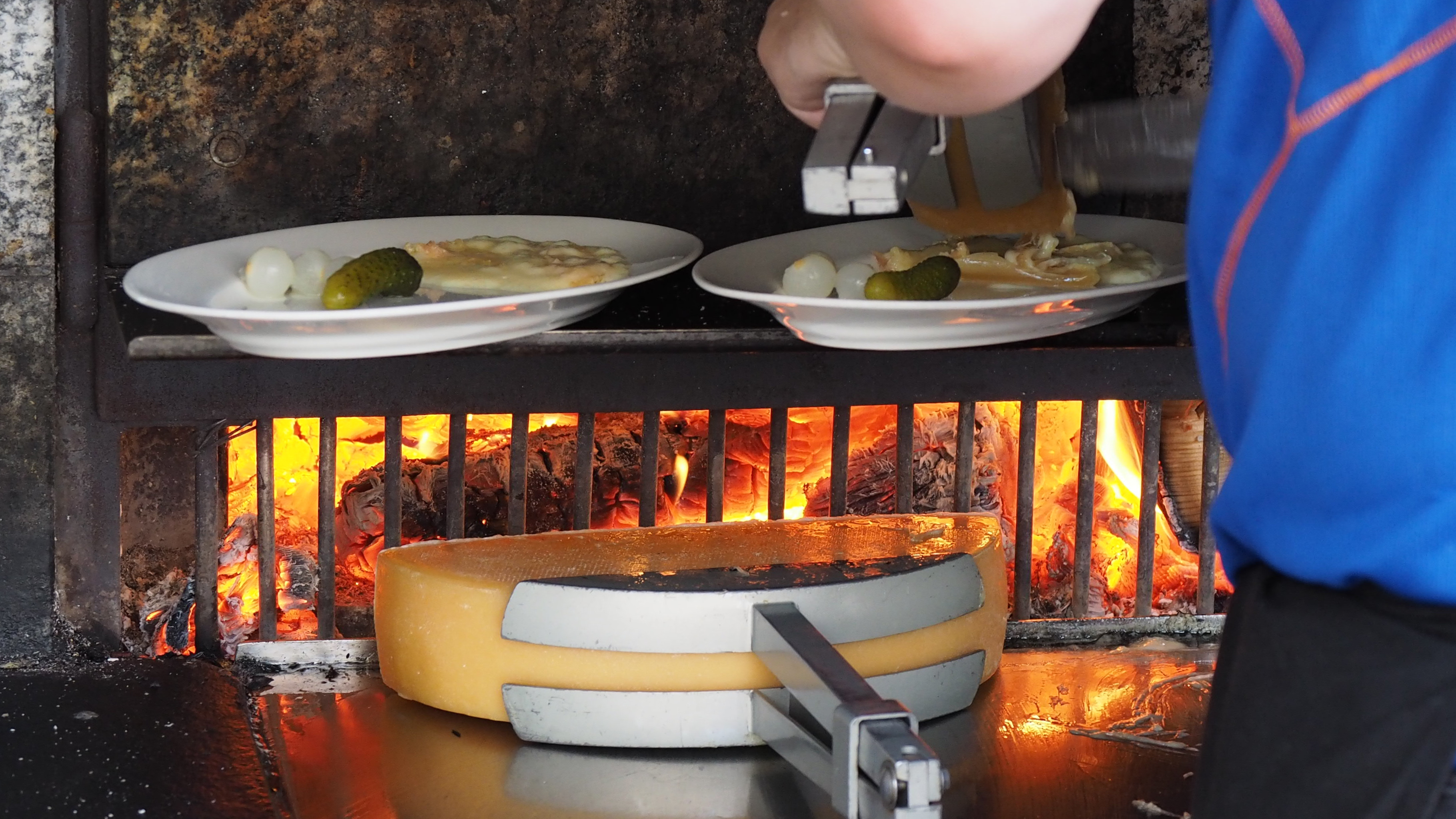
A half raclette cheese being melted on a wood fire while the other half is being scraped from its melted part in a plate

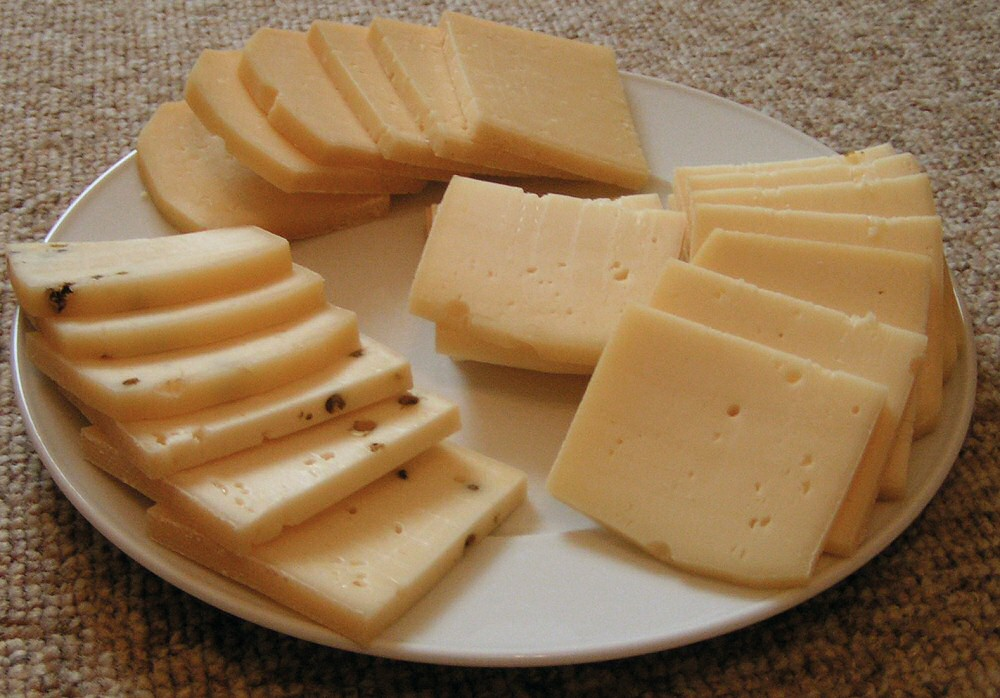
Slices of raclette for individual cooking

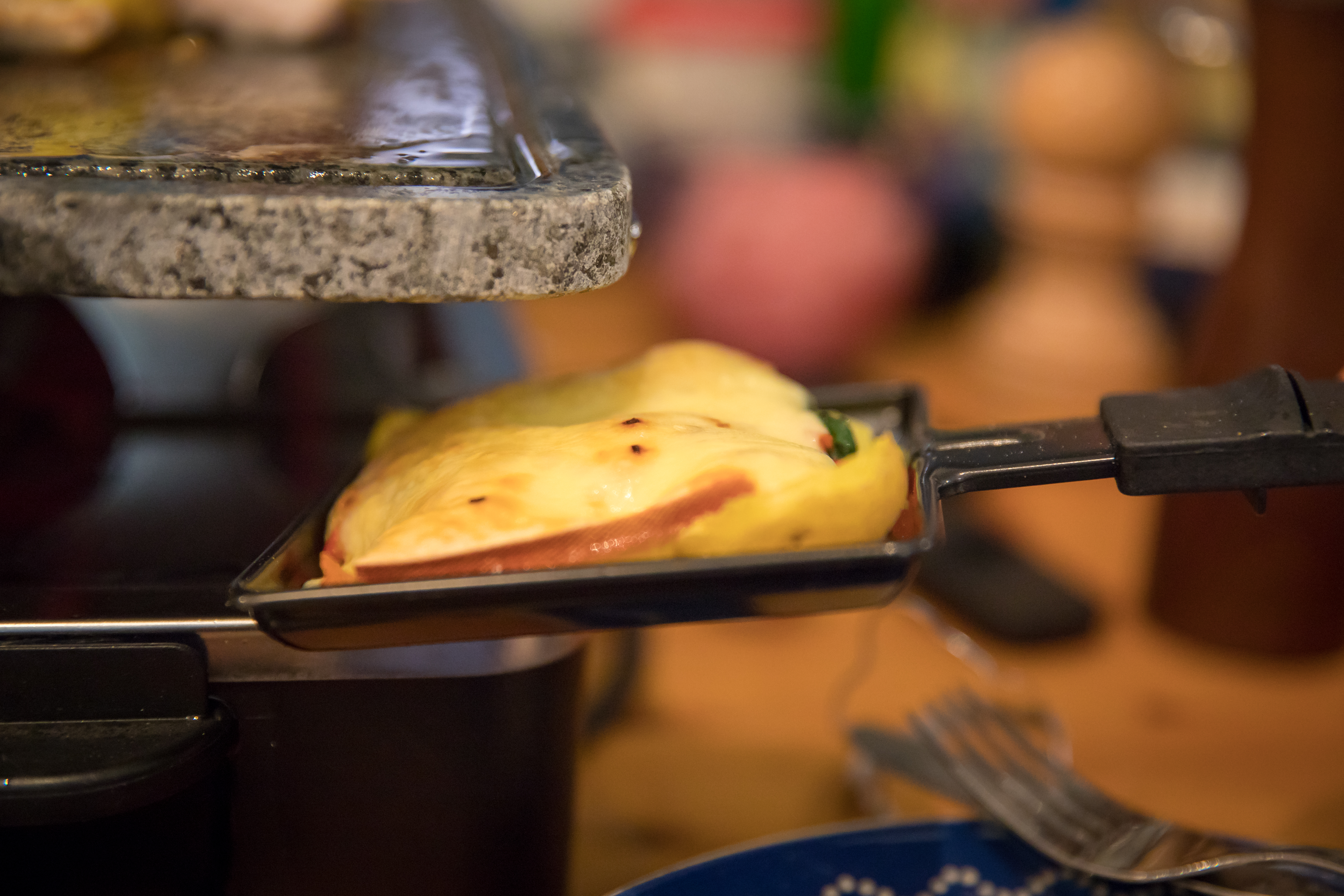
A slice of raclette cooked with an individual pan in an electric grill

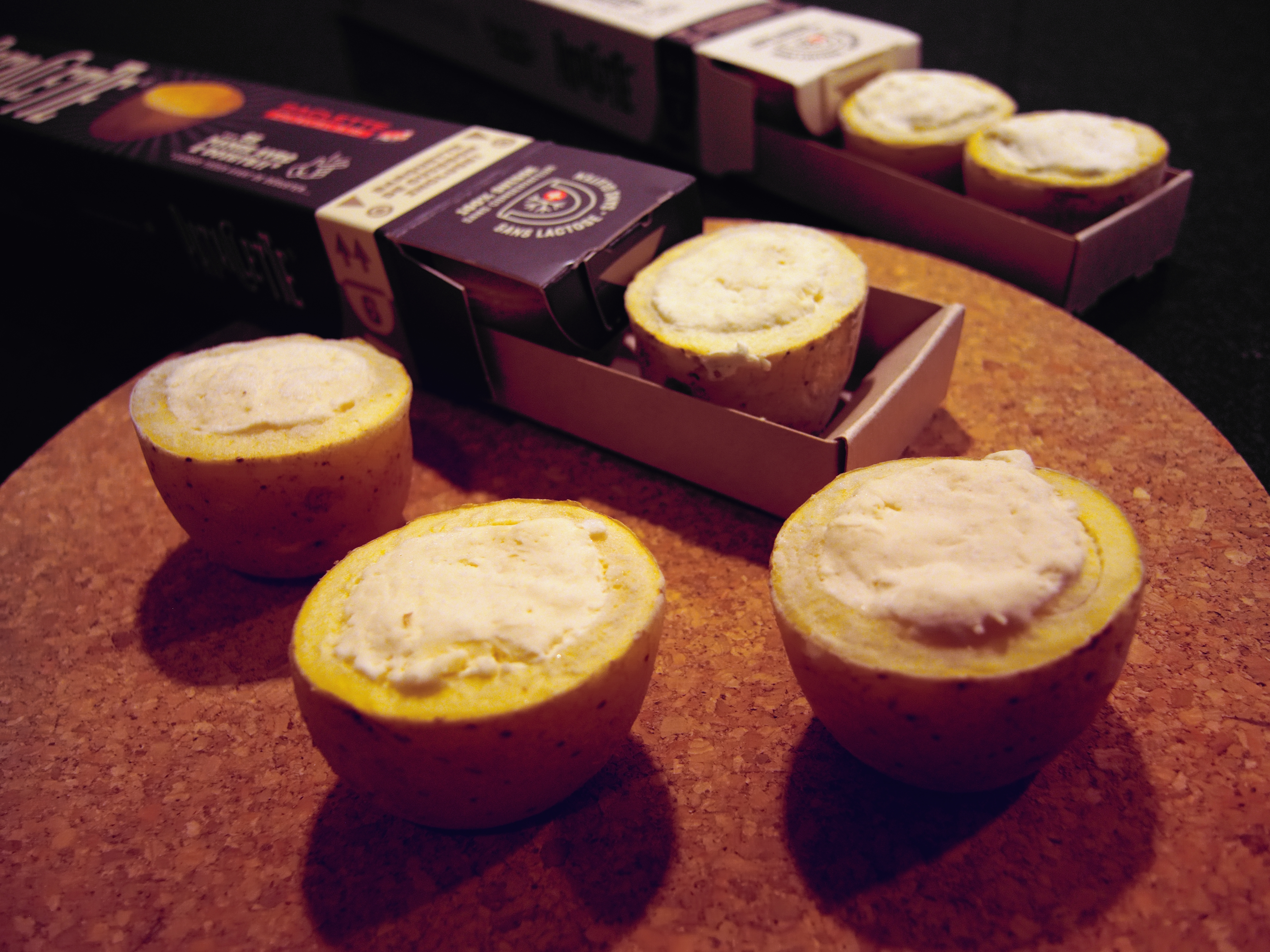
Commercially-made petits fours consisting of raclette cheese in boiled potatoes

== See also ==
- Culinary Heritage of Switzerland
- Fondue, a different Swiss dish based on cheese melted in a pot
