= Sbrinz =

Swiss hard or very hard cheese

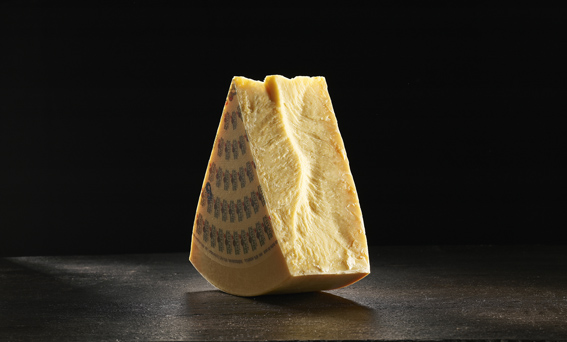
- Country of origin: Switzerland
- Region: Central Switzerland
- Texture: hard and very hard
- Fat content: 45%
- Aging time: 24 to 30 months
- Certification: AOC and AOP

Sbrinz is a very hard cheese produced in Central Switzerland. It is often used as grated cheese in Swiss cuisine, although it is also eaten in small pieces. The cheese is produced in only 42 dairies in Central Switzerland. Only local cow's milk is used when producing this cheese. It is kept in the region until ready for consumption. It is the hardest of Swiss cheeses together with Berner Hobelkäse.

Sbrinz probably got its name from the town of Brienz in the Bernese Oberland. In the 16th and 17th centuries, there was a collecting point for both cheeses from the Oberland and Central Switzerland. Most of the cheese was then transported from there across the Alps. Customers in northern Italy soon named the cheese "Sbrinz" after this place. The term then also became common in Switzerland. A second explanation is based on the adoption of the Lombard dialect word "sbrinzo", a term for hard cheese.

== Character ==
Sbrinz is an extra hard full fat cheese. It contains approximately 40% to 45% of fat when dry. The cheese must ripen for 16 months before it can be sold as Sbrinz, and the full flavour only develops after about 24–30 months in storage.

== History ==
Sbrinz is one of the oldest European cheeses. The Celtic ancestors of the Swiss were making cheese centuries before the birth of Christ. In the first century AD, Roman writer Columella (or Pliny the Elder) mentions in his writings Caseus Helveticus, which is probably Sbrinz. It seems certain, however, that it is mentioned in documents dating from 1530, which are kept in the state archive in Bern.

Starting in 2001, Sbrinz was granted an appellation d'origine contrôlée (AOC) certification. The AOC provides specifications for the origin of the milk and the processes that must be followed in order for the cheese to be labeled as Sbrinz. In 2013, this was replaced by the appellation d'origine protégée (AOP) certification.

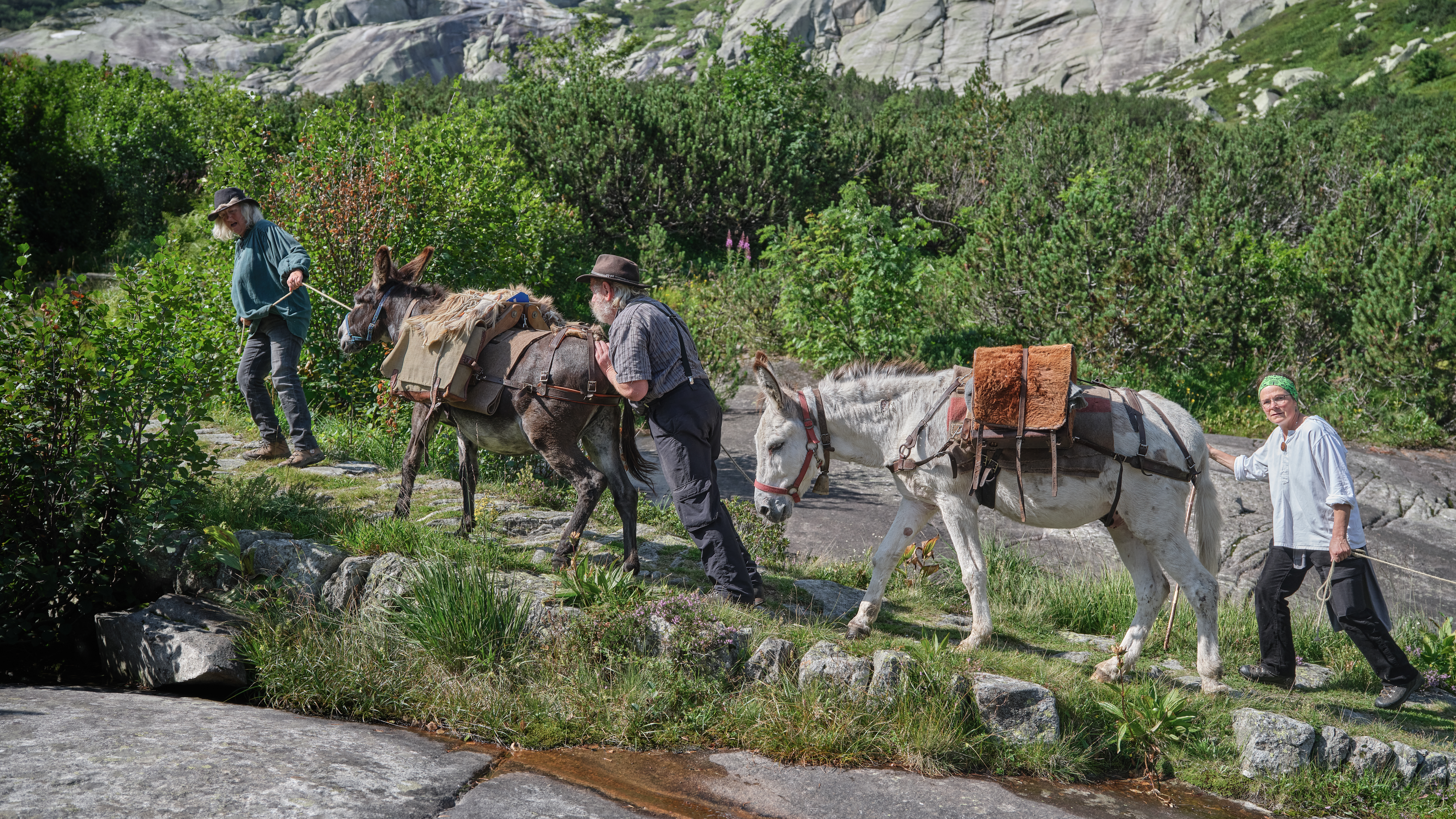
Muleteers on the Via Sbrinz, a former trade route between Central Switzerland and Italy.

== Consumption ==
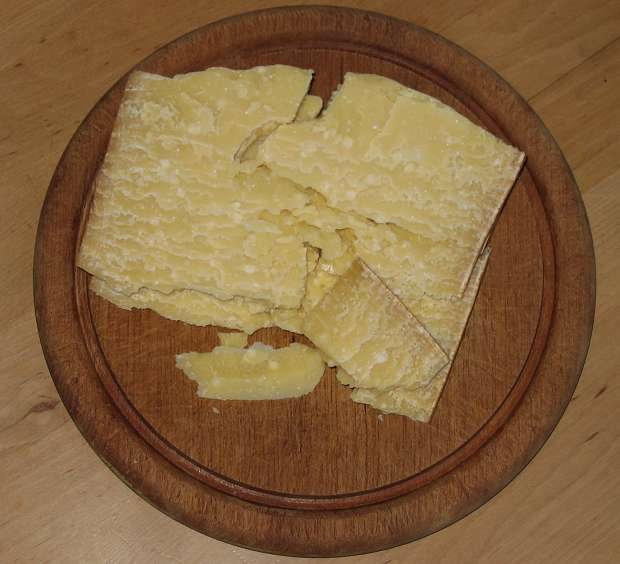
A five-year-old Sbrinz

Sbrinz is commonly consumed in several ways: it can be grated, such as on pasta, or eaten in small pieces, often to accompany wine. Traditionally, Sbrinz is never cut, but grated, broken with a special cutter, or planed. It is also eaten in thin slices planed from the hard cheese. Sbrinz is often simply eaten with bread and butter.

== See also ==
- List of Swiss cheeses
- Bergkäse
- Culinary Heritage of Switzerland
