= Eduard Amstad =

Swiss lawyer and politician

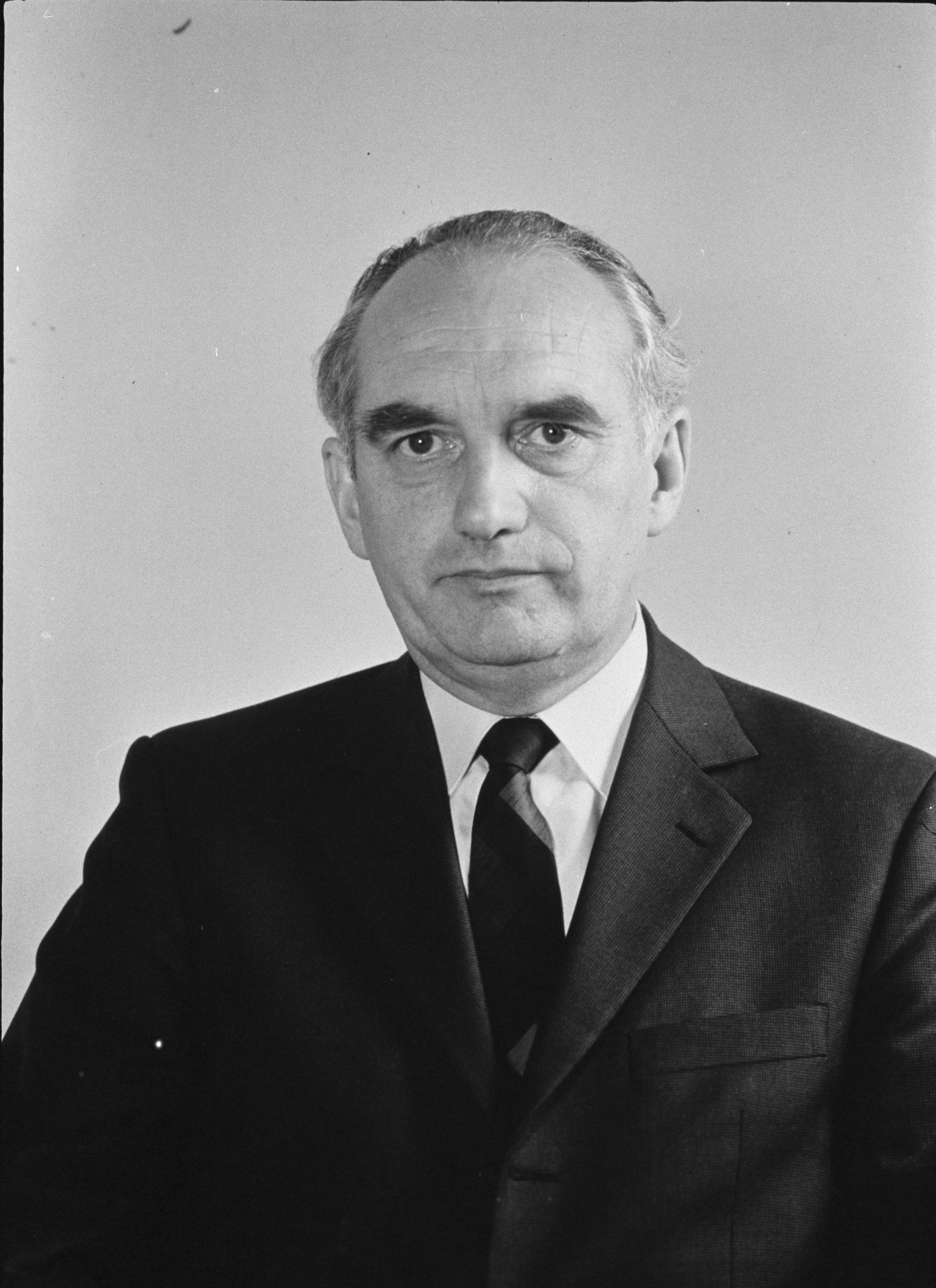

Personal details
- Born: 19 March 1922 Beckenried, Nidwalden, Switzerland
- Died: 12 October 2015 (aged 93) Beckenried, Nidwalden, Switzerland
- Party: Christian Democratic Party
- Spouse: Annette Baumann
- Education: University of Fribourg; University of Zurich; University of Lausanne
- Occupation: Lawyer, judge

Eduard Amstad (19 March 1922 – 12 October 2015) was a Swiss lawyer, judge, and politician from Beckenried in the Canton of Nidwalden. He is recognized as the father of the Nidwalden Constitution of 1965 and served in various judicial and political roles at the cantonal and federal levels throughout his career.

== Early life and education ==
Eduard Amstad was born on 19 March 1922 in Beckenried to Eduard Amstad, a cheese merchant and president of the cantonal court. He was the nephew of Josef Maria Amstad and Theodor Amstad. He attended gymnasium in Altdorf (Uri) and Stans, then studied law at the universities of Fribourg, Zurich, and Lausanne. He earned his doctorate in 1949 from the University of Fribourg. He married Annette Baumann, a harpist and daughter of Friedrich Baumann, a textile merchant.

== Legal and judicial career ==
Amstad served as cantonal investigating judge from 1950 to 1952, then established himself as a lawyer in Stans from 1952 to 1976. He was appointed judge at the Federal Insurance Court in Lucerne from 1976 to 1987, and subsequently served as ombudsman for private insurance companies from 1987 to 1992.

== Political career ==
Amstad's political career began at the local level as a Christian Democratic member of the communal council (executive) of Beckenried from 1952 to 1958, serving as president from 1955 to 1958. He was elected to the Grand Council of Nidwalden from 1958 to 1962, then served as a member of the cantonal government (Councillor of State) responsible for justice from 1962 to 1970. Concurrently, he was elected to the Council of States from 1967 to 1976, representing Nidwalden at the federal level.

== Constitutional work and cultural engagement ==
Amstad is credited as the father of the Nidwalden Constitution of 1965, a significant contribution to the canton's legal framework. Beyond his political and judicial work, he was actively engaged in promoting culture in the canton, notably supporting the Rosenburg house in Stans.

== Bibliography ==
- Nidwaldner Volksblatt, 19 March 1987
