= Appellation d'origine protégée (Switzerland) =

Swiss protected geographic appellation

Logo AOP (Switzerland)

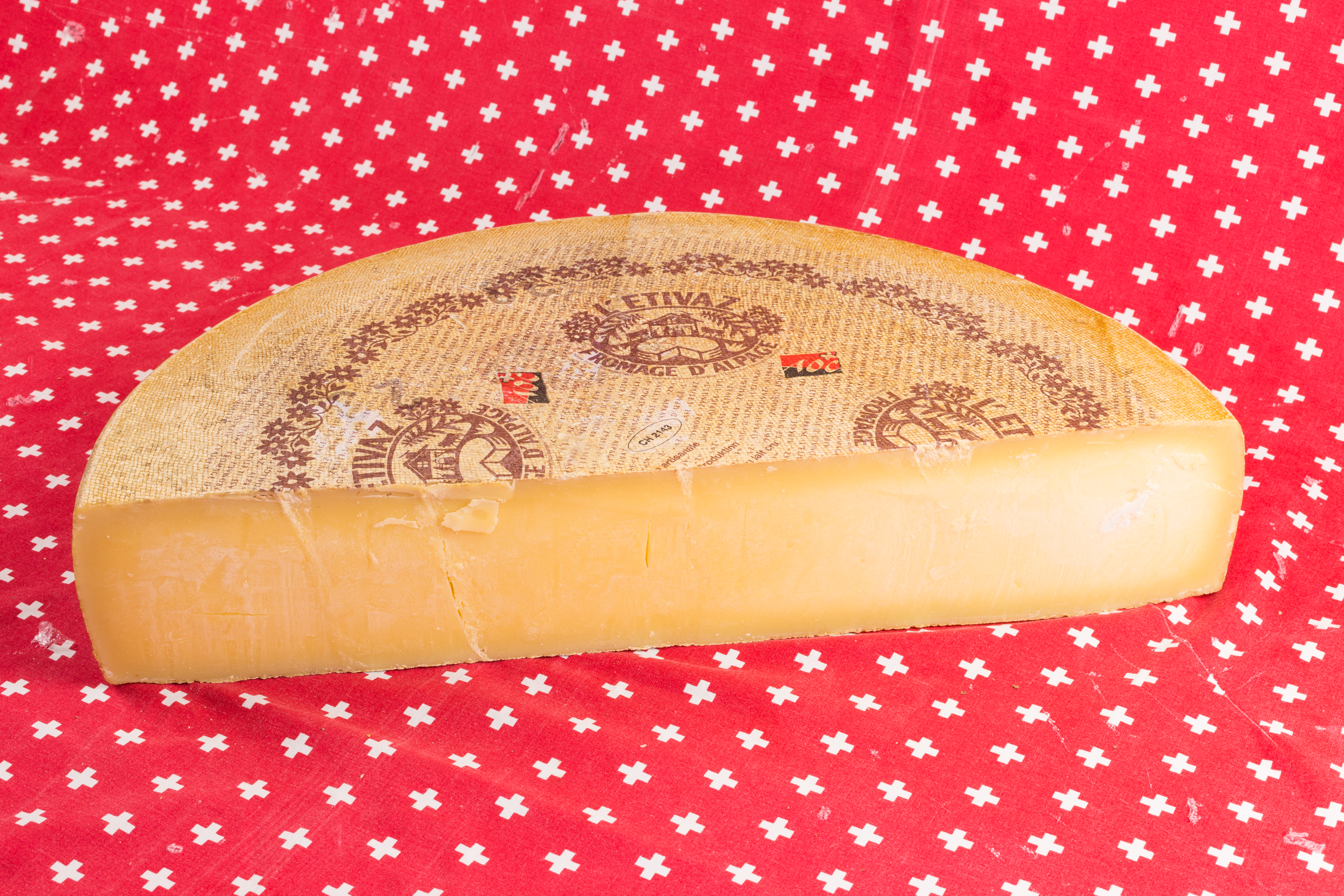
In 2000, the cheese L'Etivaz was the first Swiss product other than wine to obtain an appellation d'origine contrôlée. In 2013, the certification was replaced by the appellation d'origine protégée (AOP). The AOC logo is visible on the rind.

In Switzerland, the appellation d'origine protégée (French pronunciation: [apɛlasjɔ̃ dɔʁiʒin pʁɔteʒe], lit. 'protected designation of origin'; abbr. AOP [a.o.pe]) is a geographical indication (see also Appellation) protecting the origin and the quality of traditional food products other than wines (wines have another label called appellation d'origine contrôlée, AOC, 'controlled designation of origin').

In the past, the appellation d'origine contrôlée certification was used for both wines and other food products. In 2013, to match the system of the European Union, the appellation d'origine contrôlée was replaced by the appellation d'origine protégée for agricultural products other than wine.

== Geographical indications and traditional specialities in Switzerland ==
The appellation d'origine protégée (AOP, protected designation of origin) certifies that "everything, from the raw material to the processing and the final product, comes from one clearly defined region of origin".

The indication géographique protégée (IGP, protected geographical indication) certifies that products were "either manufactured, processed or prepared at their place of origin".

The appellation d'origine contrôlée (AOC, controlled designation of origin) certifies wines.

== Products ==
=== Appellation d'origine protégée (AOP) ===
- Abricotine / Eau-de-vie d’abricot du Valais
- Berner Alpkäse / Berner Hobelkäse
- Boutefas
- Cardon épineux genevois
- Cuchaule
- Damassine
- Eau-de-vie de poire du Valais
- Huile de noix vaudoise
- Jambon de la Borne
- Munder Safran
- Pain de seigle valaisan
- Poire à Botzi
- Rheintaler Ribel
- Zuger / Rigi Kirsch

Cheeses

- Berner Alpkäse/Berner Hobelkäse
- Emmentaler
- L'Etivaz
- Formaggio d'alpe ticinese
- Glarner Alpkäse
- Gruyère
- Raclette du Valais / Walliser Raclette
- Sbrinz
- Tête de Moine, Fromage de Bellelay
- Vacherin Fribourgeois
- Vacherin Mont d'Or
- Werdenberger Sauerkäse, Liechtensteiner Sauerkäse und Bloderkäse

==== AOP candidates ====
- Jambon de la borne
- Grappa Ticino

=== Indication géographique protégée (IGP) ===
- Appenzeller Mostbröckli
- Appenzeller Siedwurst
- Appenzeller Pantli
- Berner Zungenwurst
- Bündnerfleisch
- Glarner Kalberwurst
- Longeole
- Saucisse d'Ajoie
- Saucisson neuchâtelois et Saucisse neuchâteloise
- Saucisson vaudois
- Saucisse aux choux vaudoise
- St. Galler Bratwurst
- Walliser Rohschinken
- Walliser Trockenfleisch
- Walliser Trockenspeck
- Zuger Kirschtorte

==== IGP candidates ====
- Absinthe de Val-de-Travers

== See also ==
- Geographical indications and traditional specialities in the European Union
- Agriculture in Switzerland
- Culinary Heritage of Switzerland

== Bibliography ==
- (in French) Stéphane Boisseaux and Dominique Barjolle, La bataille des AOC en Suisse. Les appellations d'origine contrôlées et les nouveaux terroirs, collection « Le savoir suisse », Presses polytechniques et universitaires romandes, 2004 (ISBN 9782880746131).
