= Culinary Heritage of Switzerland =

Encyclopedia of Swiss cuisine

Kulinarisches Erbe der Schweiz Patrimoine culinaire suisse Patrimonio culinario svizzero Patrimoni culinar svizzer
- Available in: German, French, Italian, Romansh
- Owner: Culinary Heritage of Switzerland Association
- Creators: Stéphane Boisseaux, Franziska Schürch, Heike Zimmermann, Alexandra M. Rückert and others
- Website: www.patrimoineculinaire.ch
- Commercial: No
- Launched: 9 December 2008

The Culinary Heritage of Switzerland (German: Kulinarisches Erbe der Schweiz, French: Patrimoine culinaire suisse, Italian: Patrimonio culinario svizzero, Romansh: Patrimoni culinar svizzer) is a multilingual online encyclopedia of traditional Swiss cuisine and produce.

== History ==
The project was initiated after Swiss MP Josef Zisyadis's parliamentary motion in 2000. After obtaining CHF 2 million of funding by the Swiss federal government, the Swiss cantons and private sponsors, the private association "Culinary Heritage of Switzerland" was founded in 2003.

The association hired a team of researchers, including ethnologists and historians, to write the articles and carry out field research by interviewing Swiss bakers, butchers, cultural historians, archivists, and farmer's wives. It made the encyclopedia, with an initial scope of some 400 articles, available to the public on 9 December 2008 at no charge.

== Scope ==
To be included in the association's database, a food must be recognised as traditionally Swiss, have been produced for at least 40 years, and must remain in production. The project's scope is limited to processed foodstuffs, such as cheeses or meat products. It does not include unprocessed food (with a few exceptions), wines, recipes, or dishes.

== See also ==
- Appellation d'origine protégée (Switzerland)
