= Scharfe Maxx =

Swiss hard cheese

Der scharfe Maxx
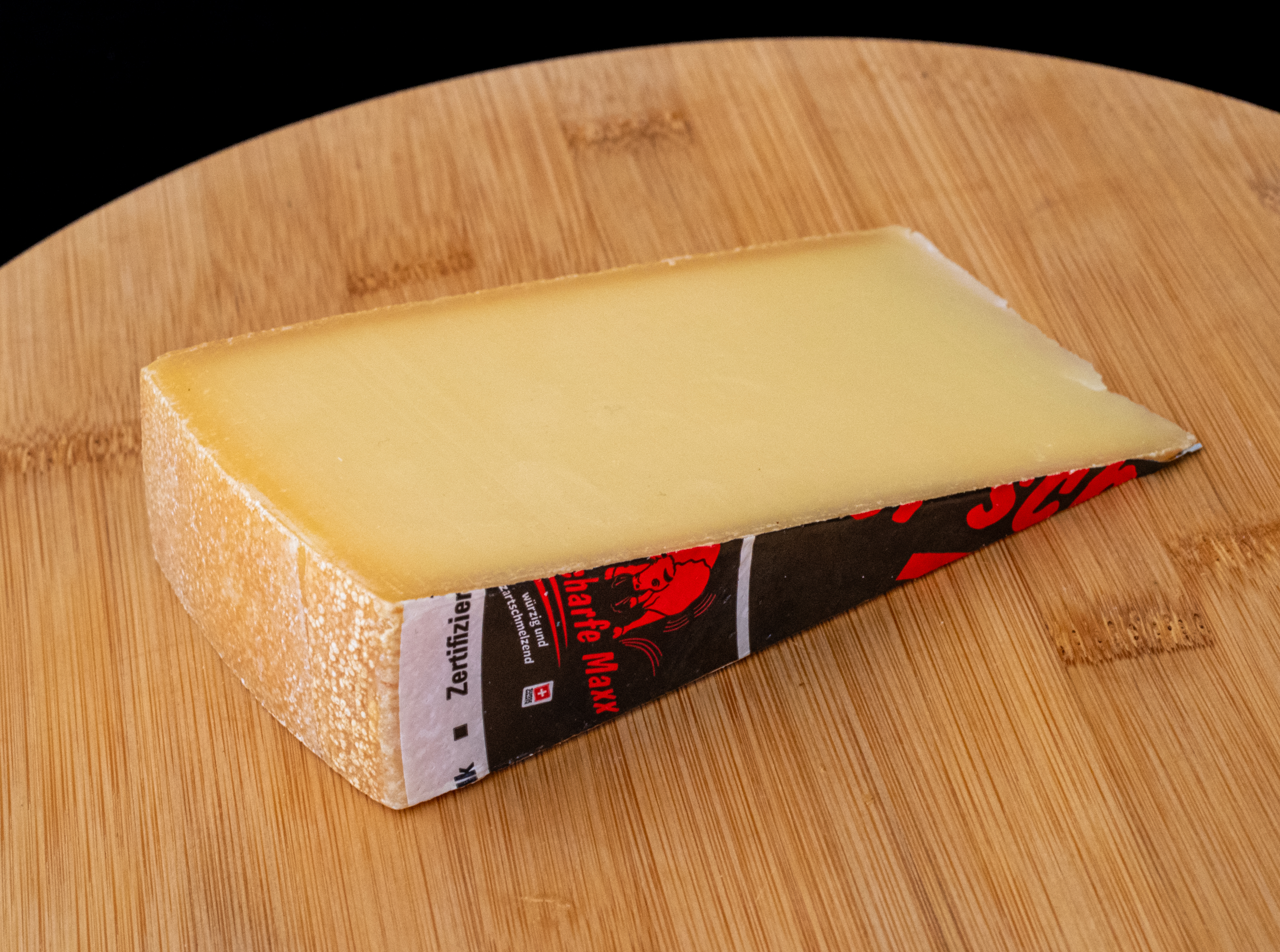
- Other names: Der scharfe Maxx
- Country of origin: Switzerland
- Region: Thurgau
- Town: Hatswil
- Source of milk: thermized cows' milk cheese
- Pasteurized: no
- Texture: hard
- Aging time: 6 to 9 months

Der Scharfe Maxx is a Swiss hard cheese from the canton of Thurgau. It is a hard cows' milk cheese with a pungent taste that is made from thermized milk. The literal translation of "Der Scharfe Maxx" means "the sharp Maxx". It is classified as a Swiss-type or Alpine cheese.

The cheese is produced in the Studer cheesery in Hatswil (Hefenhofen) in the canton of Thurgau close to the Lake Constance. The cheesery is run by the Studer family in the third generation.

The Scharfe Maxx tastes similar to an Appenzeller, but is creamier. Similar to other Appenzeller cheeses, the Scharfe Maxx is made with thermized milk.

== See also ==
- List of Swiss cheeses
