= Swiss cheese =

Swiss cheese may refer to:

== Cheese ==
- Swiss cheeses and dairy products (from Switzerland)
  - List of Swiss cheeses
- Swiss-type cheeses or Alpine cheeses, a class of cooked pressed cheeses now made in many countries
- Swiss cheese (North America), any of several related varieties of cheese that resemble Emmentaler

== Biology ==
- Swiss cheese cartilage dysplasia or Kniest dysplasia, a form of dwarfism
- Swiss cheese plant (disambiguation)

== Mathematics and physics ==
- Swiss cheese (mathematics), subset of the complex plane with circular holes
- Swiss cheese features, pits in the south polar ice cap of Mars
- Swiss cheese model, of accident causation, used in risk analysis and risk management

== See also ==
- Swiss Cheese Union, Swiss marketing body, up to 1999
