= Swiss =

Swiss most commonly refers to:

- the adjectival form of Switzerland
- Swiss people

Swiss may also refer to:

== Places ==
- Swiss, Missouri
- Swiss, North Carolina
- Swiss, West Virginia
- Swiss, Wisconsin

== Other uses ==
- Swiss Café, an old café located in Baghdad, Iraq
- Swiss-system tournament, in various games and sports
- Swiss International Air Lines
  - Swiss Global Air Lines, a subsidiary
- Swissair, former national air line of Switzerland
- .swiss alternative TLD for Switzerland
- Swiss, frontman of the band Swiss und die Andern

== See also ==
- Swiss made, label for Swiss products
- Swiss cheese (disambiguation)
- Switzerland (disambiguation)
- Languages of Switzerland, none of which are called "Swiss"
- International Typographic Style, also known as Swiss Style, in graphic design
- Schweizer (disambiguation), meaning Swiss in German
- Schweitzer, a family name meaning Swiss in German
- Swisse, an Australian vitamin company
