= List of Swiss cheeses =

Swiss cheeses listed by type

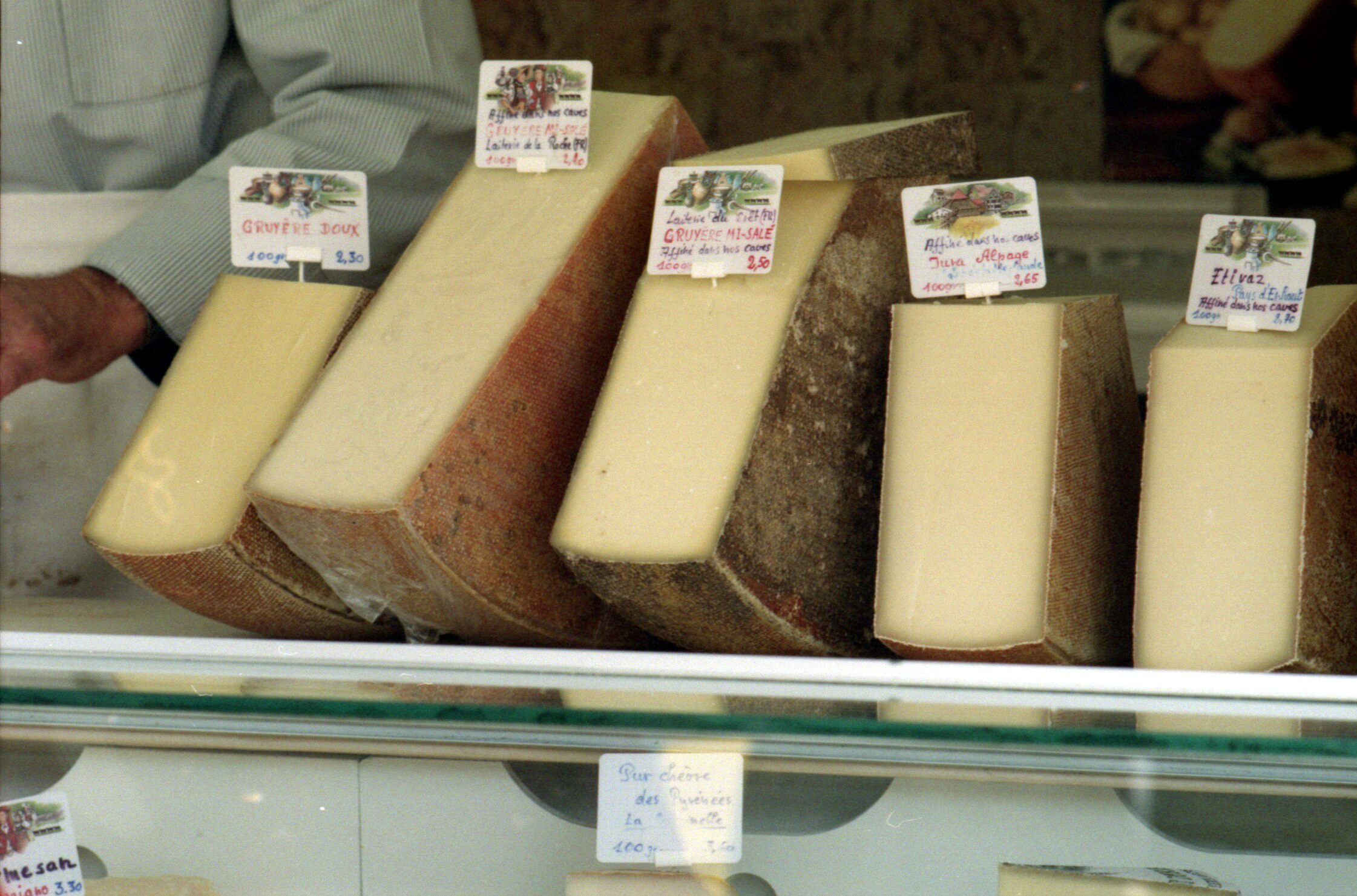
Five different Swiss Alpine cheeses on sale in Lausanne

This is a list of the varieties of traditional cheeses made in Switzerland. Switzerland produces over 475 varieties of cheese, a milk-based food produced in a large range of flavors, textures, and forms. Cow's milk is used in about 99 percent of the cheeses Switzerland produces. The remaining share is made up of sheep milk and goat milk. The export of these cheeses, some 40% of production in 2019, is economically important for Switzerland.

The best known Swiss cheeses are of the class known as Swiss-type cheeses, also known as Alpine cheeses, a group of hard or semi-hard cheeses with a distinct character, whose origins lie in the Alps of Europe, although they are now eaten and imitated in most cheesemaking parts of the world. These include Emmental, Gruyère and Appenzeller, as well as many other traditional varieties from Switzerland and neighbouring countries with Alpine regions. Their distinct character arose from the requirements of cheese made in the summer on high Alpine grasslands (alpage in French), and then transported with the cows down to the valleys in the autumn, in the historic culture of Alpine transhumance. Traditionally the cheeses were made in large rounds or "wheels" with a hard rind, to provide longevity to the shelf-life.

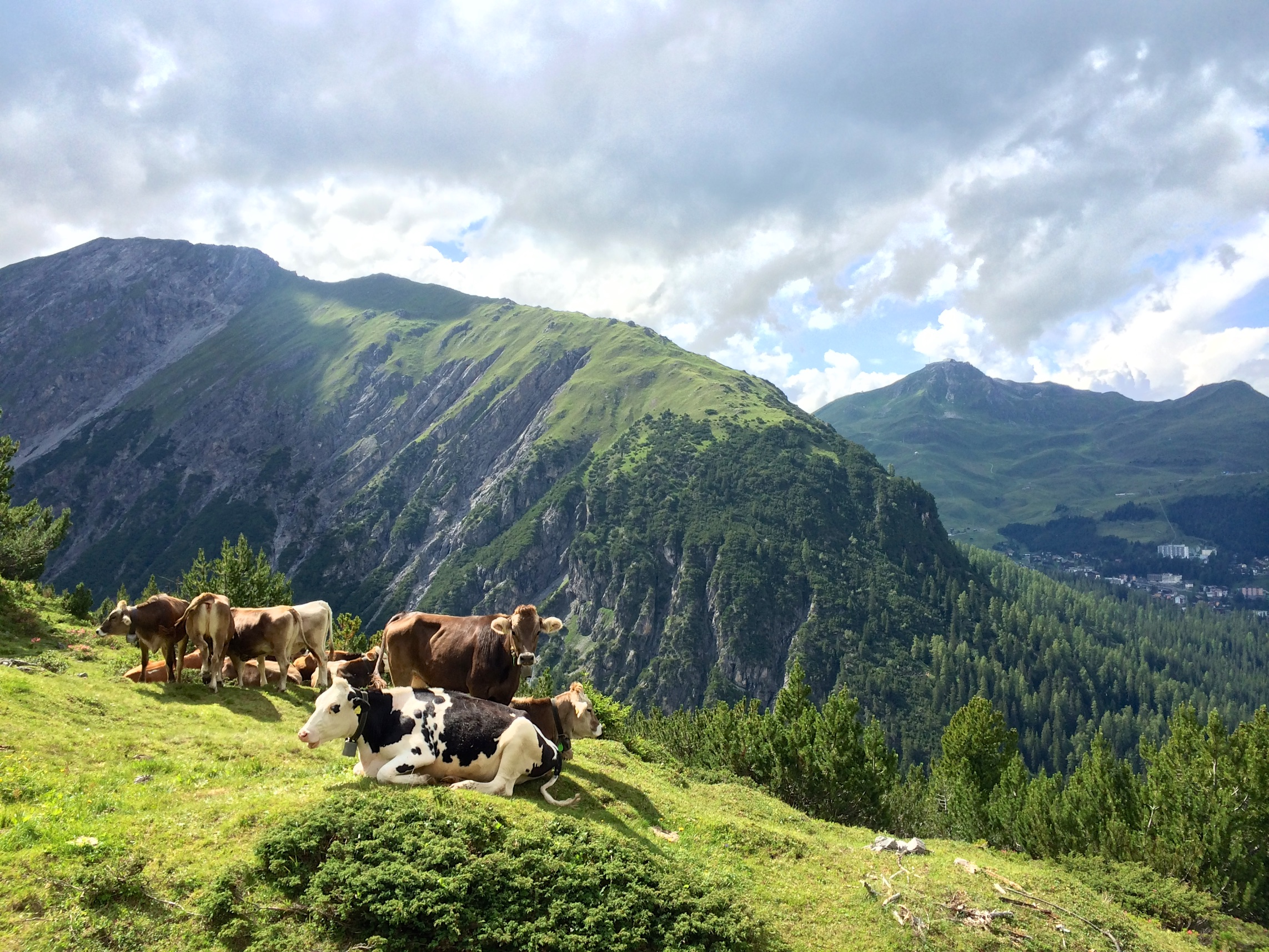
Swiss Brown cattle grazing on alpage pastures

Technically Swiss-type cheeses are "cooked", meaning made using thermophilic lactic fermentation starters, incubating the curd with a period at a high temperature of 45°C or more. Since they are later pressed to expel excess moisture, the group are also described as "'cooked pressed cheeses'", fromages à pâte pressée cuite in French. Most varieties have few if any holes, called Eyes, or holes that are much smaller than the large holes found in some Emmental or its imitations. The general eating characteristics of the cheeses are a firm but still elastic texture, flavour that is not sharp, acidic or salty, but rather nutty and buttery. When melted, which they often are in cooking, they are "gooey", and "slick, stretchy and runny".

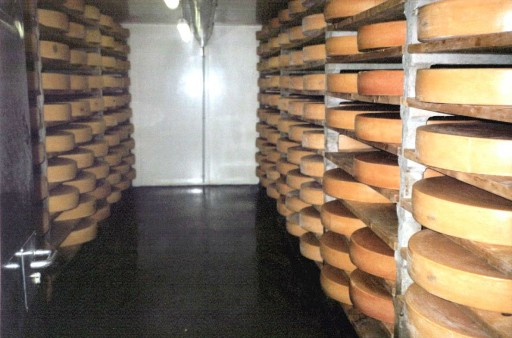
Swiss cheese being stored in a cellar in a small cheese dairy near St. Gallen

== Varieties ==
=== Extra-hard ===
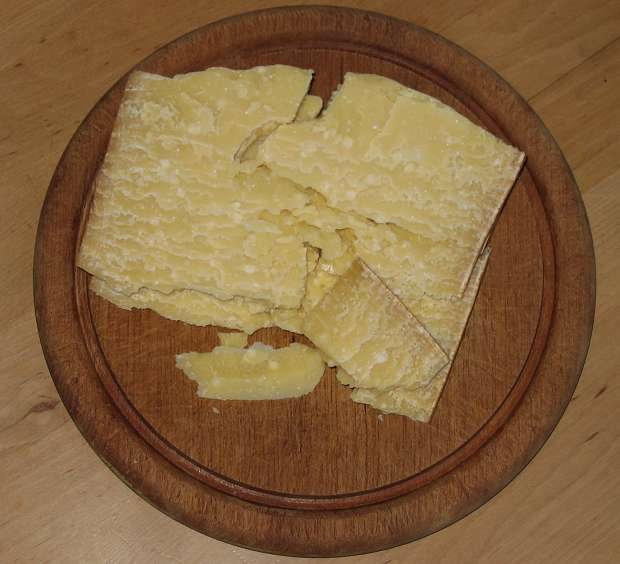
Sbrinz cheese

- Sbrinz (AOP)
- Berner Hobelkäse (AOP)

=== Hard ===
- Appenzeller
- Berner Alpkäse (AOP)
- Bündner Bergkäse
- Gruyère/Greyerzer (AOP)
- L'Etivaz (AOP)
- Röthenbacher Bergkäse
- Mutschli
- Schabziger
- Tête de Moine (AOP)

=== Semi-hard ===
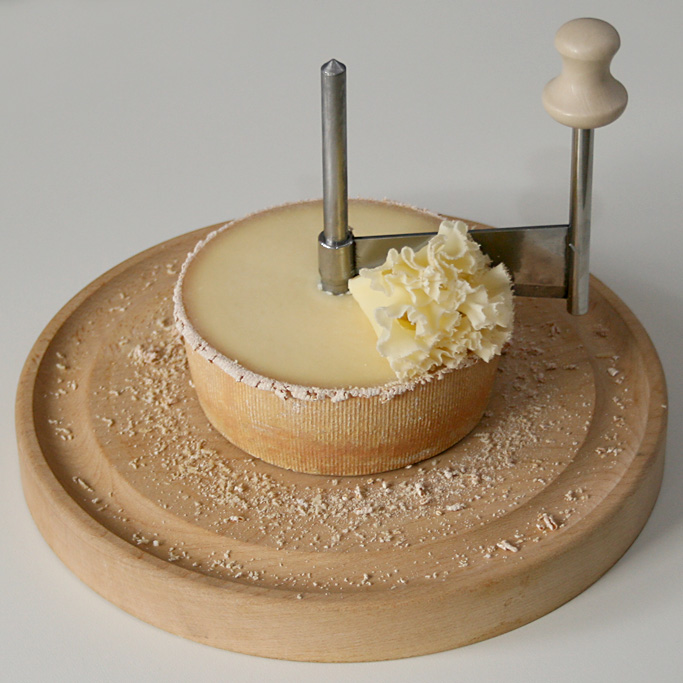
Tête de Moine with a girolle cutter

- Emmentaler (AOP)
- Raclette du Valais (AOP)
- Scharfe Maxx
- Le Marechal
- Tilsiter
- Vacherin Fribourgeois (AOP)
- Chällerhocker
- Gruyère (AOP)

=== Semi-soft ===
- Formaggini
- Luzerner Rahmkäse

=== Soft ===
- Vacherin Mont d'Or (AOP)
- Gala
- Büsciun da cavra
- Tomme Vaudoise

=== Fresh ===
- Ziger/Sérac

=== Blue ===
- Bleuchâtel

== See also ==
- List of cheeses
- List of dairy products
- Swiss Cheese Union
- Swiss cheese (North America)
