= Belper Knolle =

Swiss cheese

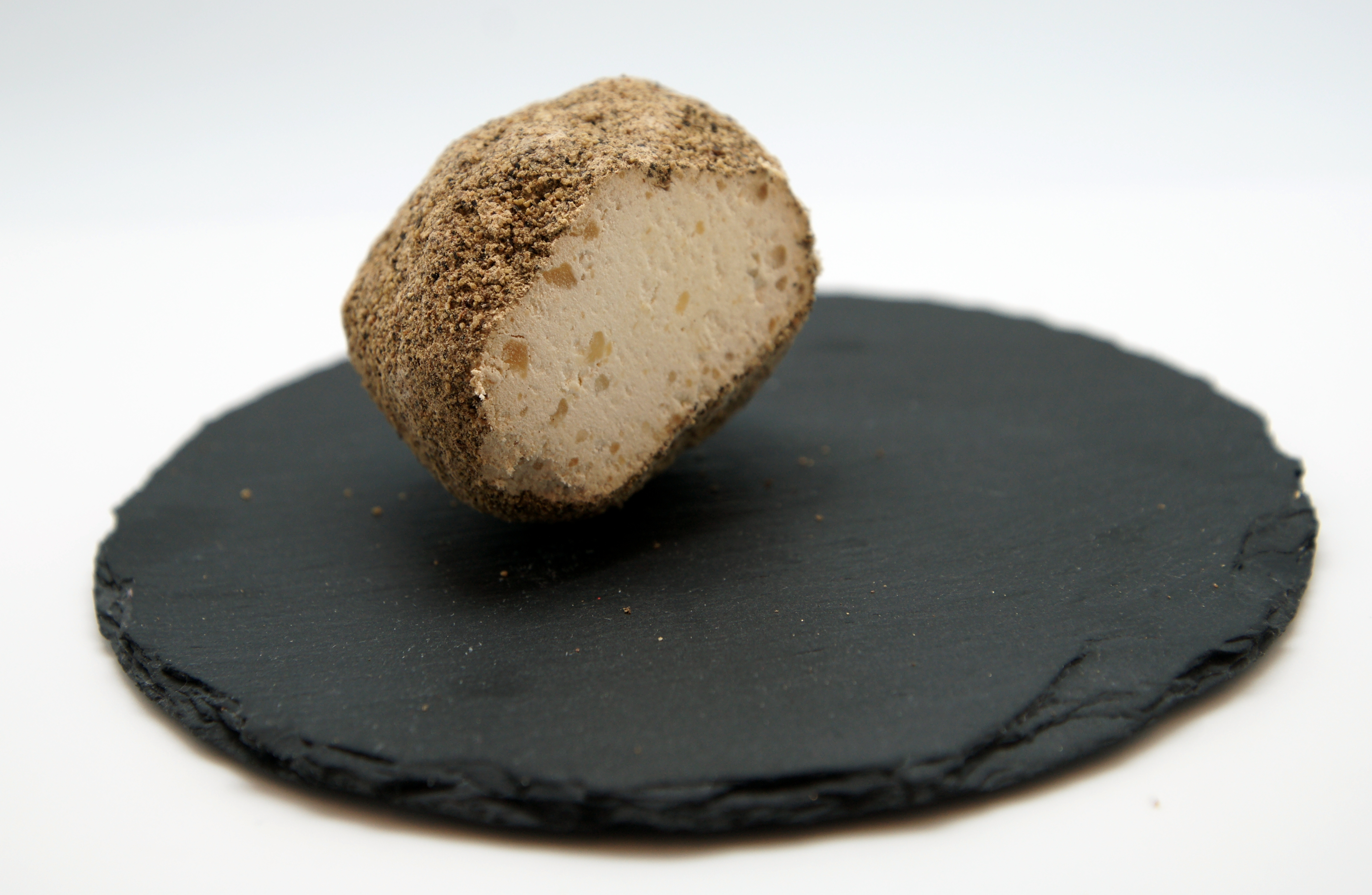
- Country of origin: Switzerland
- Source of milk: Simmental Cows
- Pasteurized: No
- Texture: hard (gold) or soft (red)
- Aging time: min. 3 months

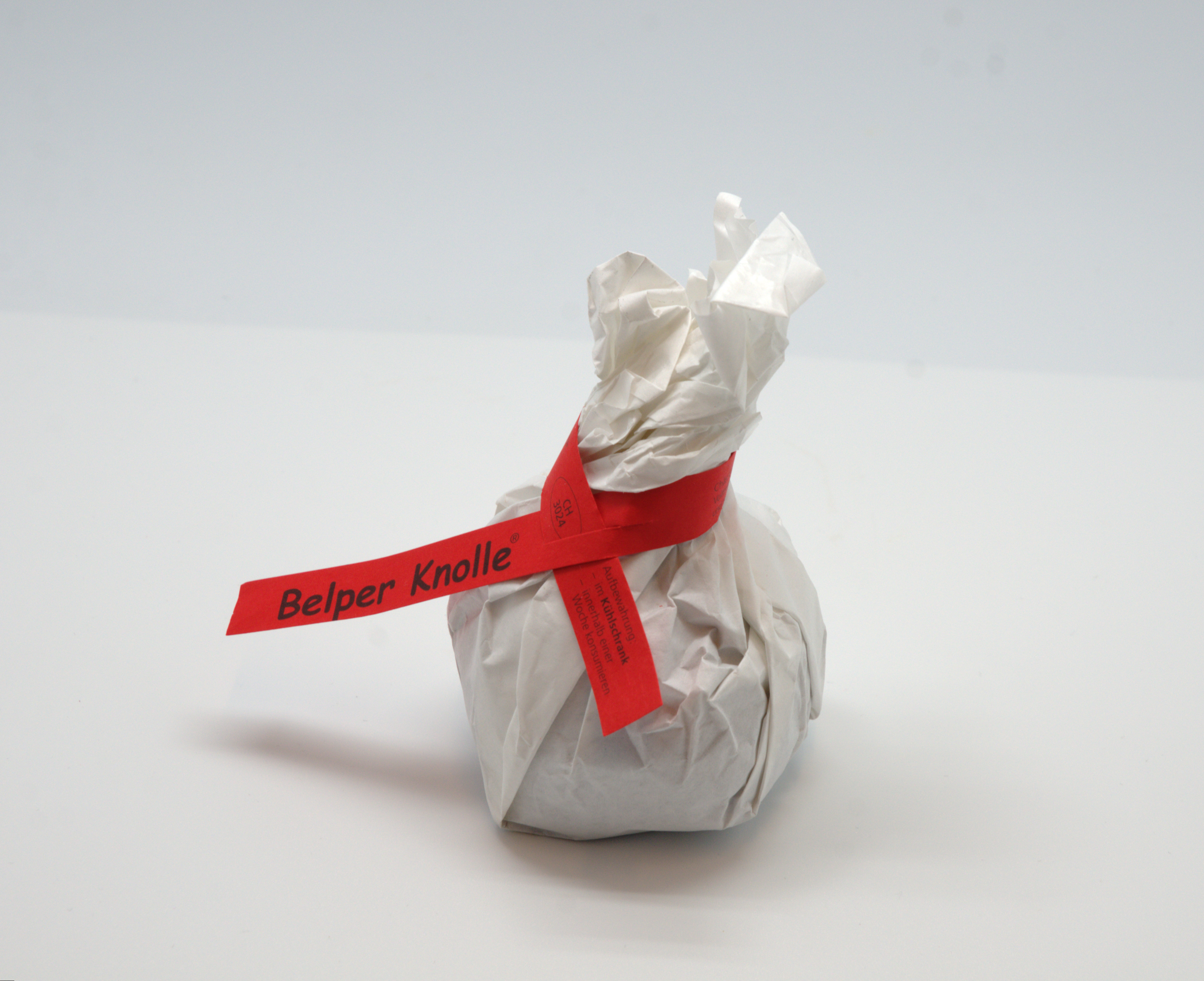
Fresh Belper Knolle with the packaging

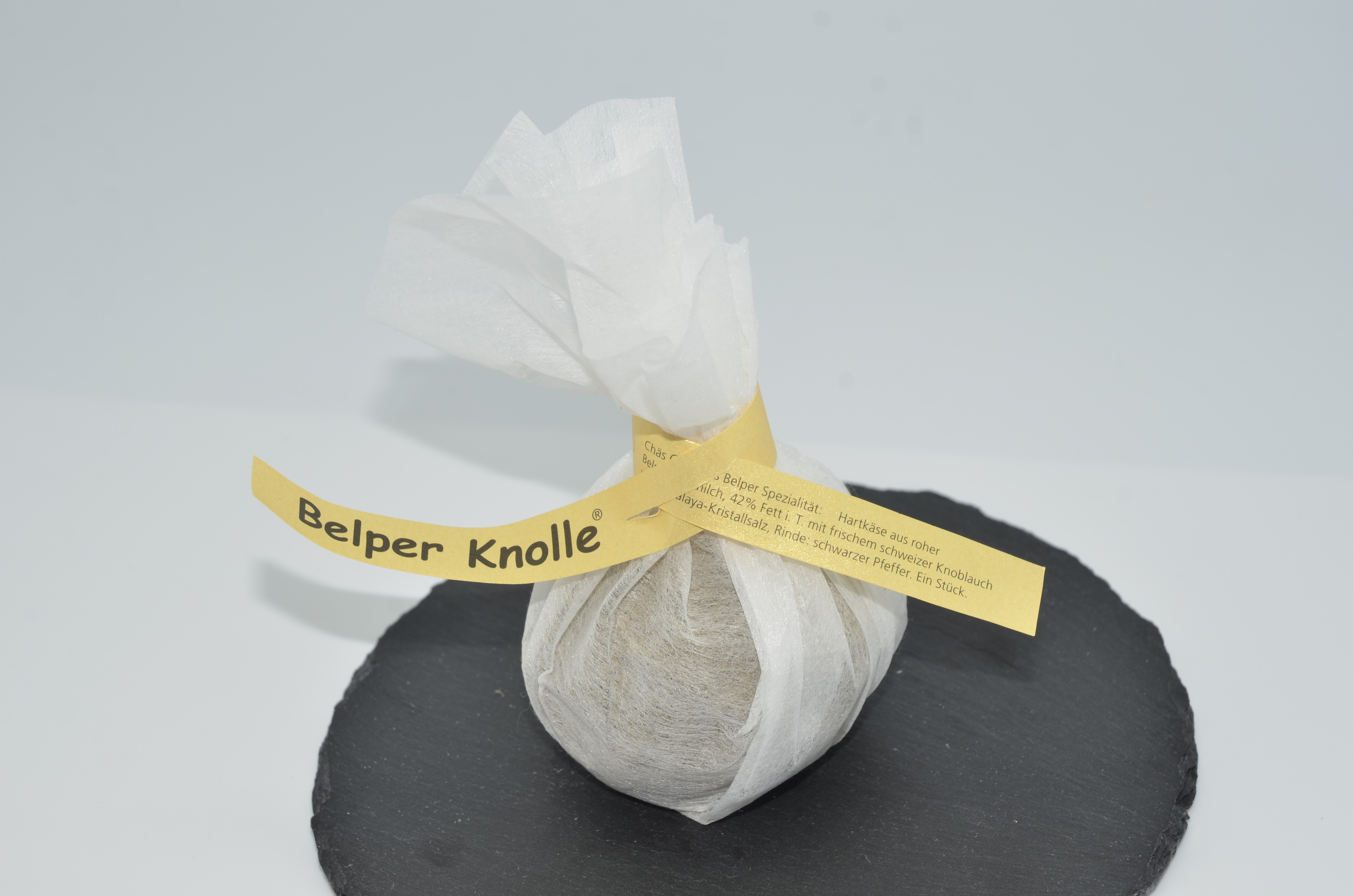
Dry Belper Knolle with the packaging

The Belper Knolle ("Belp Truffle") is a Swiss cheese made in the city of Belp, Switzerland.
