= Chällerhocker =

Swiss medium-hard Alpine cheese

- Country of origin: Switzerland
- Region: Canton of St. Gallen
- Town: Lütisburg
- Source of milk: cows
- Pasteurised: traditionally raw, but may be made from thermised or pasteurized milk depending on producer
- Texture: semi-hard / medium-hard
- Aging time: 8–12 months (typical)

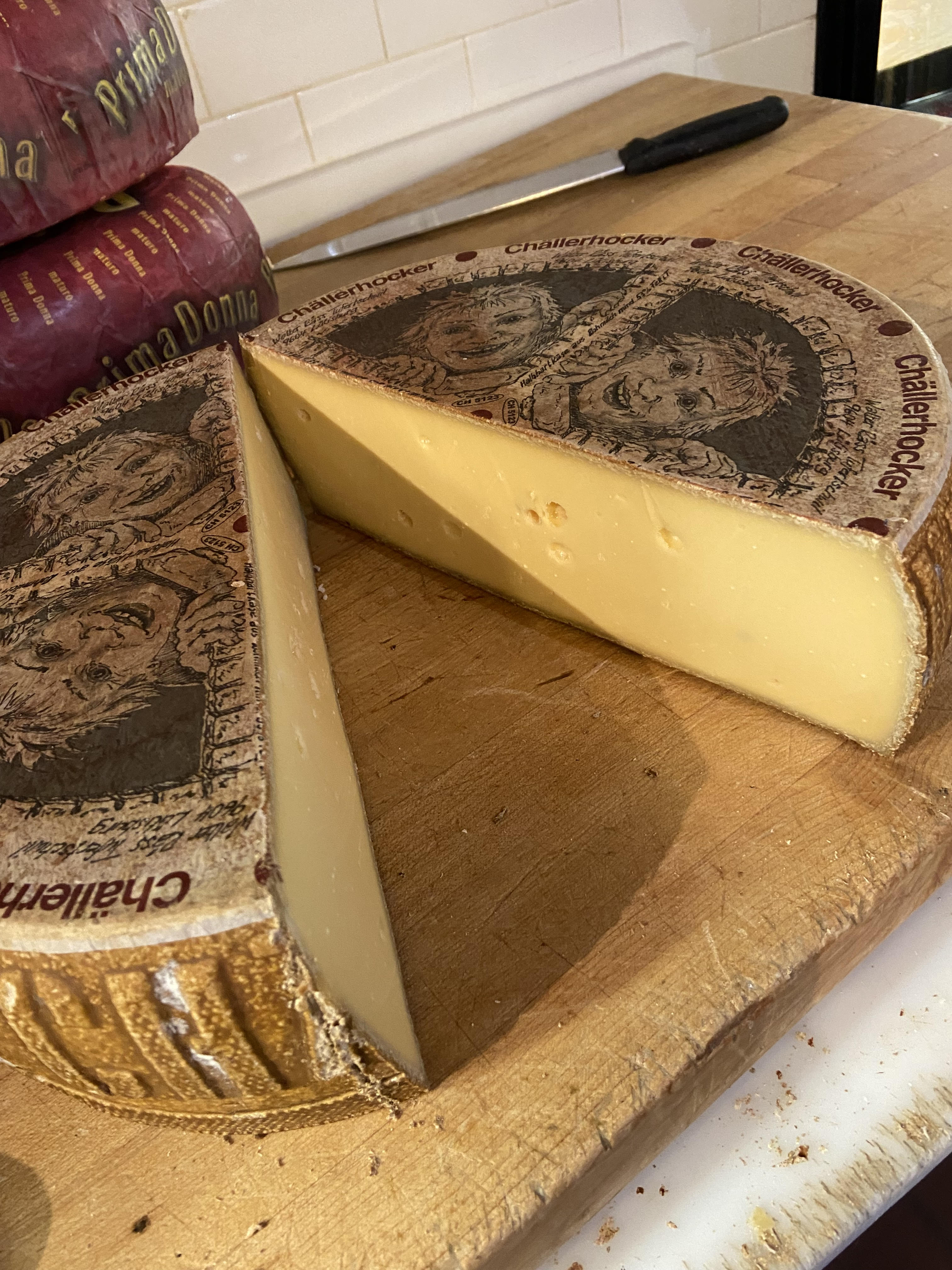
A freshly split wheel of Chällerhocker.

Chällerhocker (sometimes stylized as Challerhocker; Swiss Standard German pronunciation: [ˈçɛlərˌhɔkər]) is a Swiss semi-hard, smear-ripened cheese produced in the town of Lütisburg in the Canton of St. Gallen, Switzerland. The name means "sitting in the cellar" in Swiss German, referring to its traditional aging process. Cheesemaker Walter Rass, known for his work with Appenzeller-style cheeses, developed Chällerhocker as a distinct offering in the early 2000s.

== History ==
Chällerhocker was created as an artisanal variation on classic Swiss Alpine cheeses, building upon Walter Rass's expertise with Appenzeller. Over the past two decades, it has gained recognition internationally for its unique flavor profile and careful aging process.

== Production ==
Produced from cow's milk, Chällerhocker is made with a yogurt starter. It typically undergoes a smear-ripening process, where the rind is washed with brine and spices during maturation. Each wheel is aged in cellars for around 8 to 12 months, allowing the cheese to develop a firm yet supple texture and a reddish-brown rind. Cheese professionals note that the repeated washing helps cultivate unique surface cultures that contribute to Chällerhocker's signature flavor.

== Characteristics ==
Chällerhocker has a pale, ivory interior with small holes and a thin, brine-washed rind. Its flavor profile is nutty, sweet, and slightly tangy, with hints of brown butter and caramel. The cheese melts well and is commonly used in fondue or grated over dishes, but is also enjoyed as a table cheese. Because of its smooth melt and balanced flavor, it can be recommended in place of or alongside traditional Alpine cheeses like Gruyère or Appenzeller.

== In popular culture ==
Chällerhocker made an appearance in Season 12, Episode 8 (titled "The Colostomy Bag") of the HBO series Curb Your Enthusiasm, although it was referred to by the fictional name "Vonderdonk."

== See also ==
- List of Swiss cheeses
- Culinary Heritage of Switzerland
- List of cheeses
- Swiss cheeses and dairy products
