= Vacherin Mont d'Or =

Soft cheese made in France and Switzerland

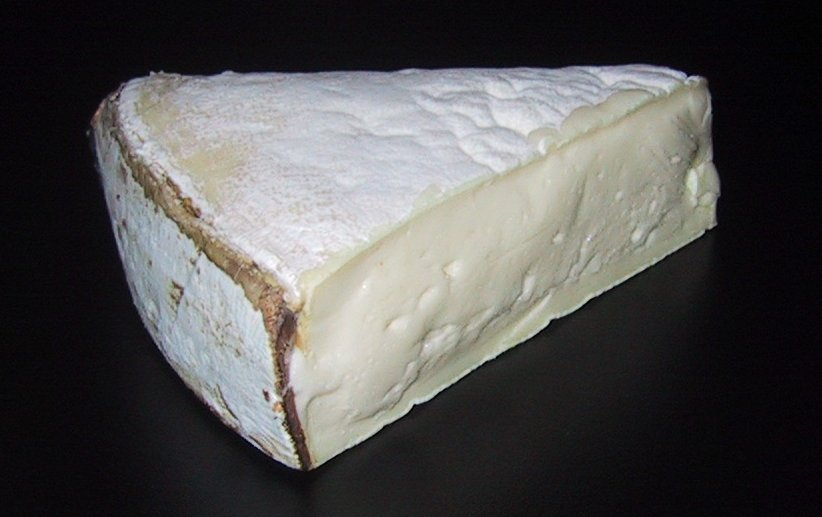
- Country of origin: France, Switzerland
- Region: Franche-Comté, and Vallée de Joux (canton of Vaud)
- Source of milk: Cows
- Pasteurized: Traditionally, no
- Texture: washed rind soft cheese
- Aging time: 5-7 weeks
- Certification: AOC France 1981; PDO France 1996; AOC France 2003; AOC Switzerland 2003; AOP Switzerland 2013
- Named after: Mont d'Or

Vacherin Mont d'Or (French pronunciation: [vaʃʁɛ̃ mɔ̃ dɔʁ]), or simply Vacherin ([vaʃʁɛ̃]), is a cow's milk (French vache, "cow") cheese. Two main types of French or Swiss Vacherin cheeses exist.

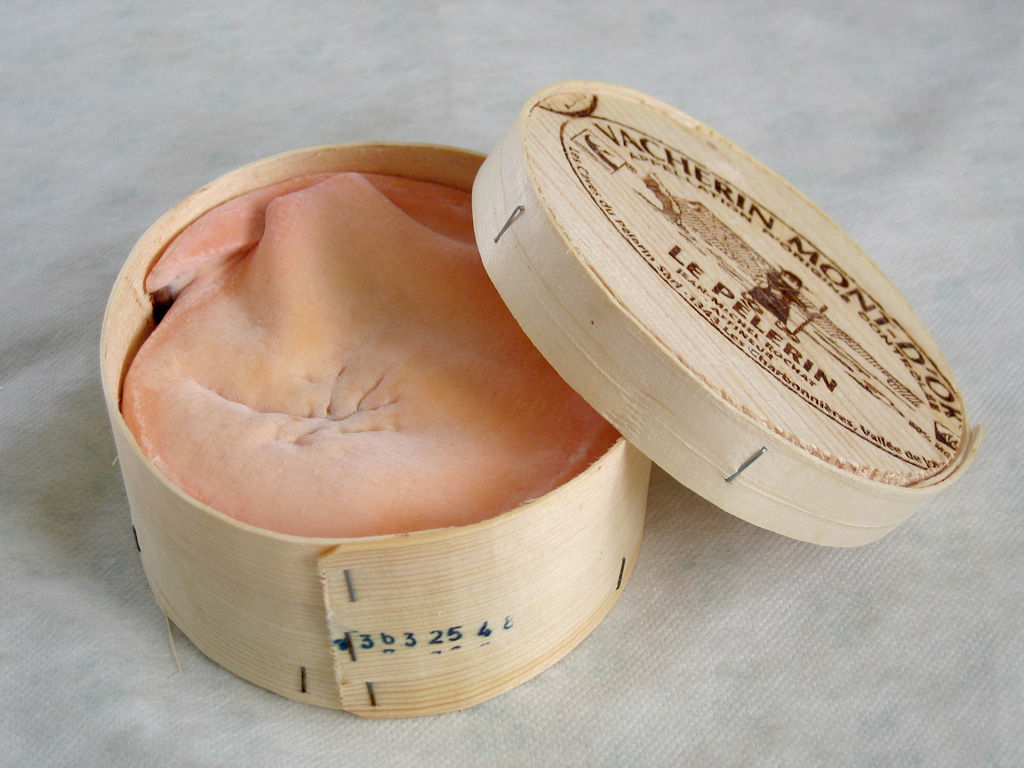
Swiss Vacherin Mont d'Or

One type of Vacherin cheese is called mont d'Or, or Vacherin du Haut-Doubs, from France, or Vacherin Mont-d'Or from Switzerland (though it tends to just be called Vacherin in the local shops). It is a soft, rich, seasonal cheese made from cow's milk in Switzerland and France, usually in villages of the Jura Mountains (an origin that has been officially controlled since 1981), and has a grayish-yellow washed rind. The cheese is wrapped in a "sangle" made from the cambium of a Norway spruce tree (French: Épicéa commun) for about two weeks at least, which gives the cheese a unique flavour. It typically contains 45 to 50 percent milk fat (in dry matter), and is produced between August 15 and March 15, and sold between September 10 and May 10. The Swiss Vacherin Mont d'Or is generally made with thermized milk (pasteurization is not allowed), while the French Vacherin du Haut-Doubs is unpasteurized. It is traditionally made in the winter months when the cows come down from Alpage (mountain pastures) and there is not enough milk to make Comté cheese. It is marketed in round boxes of various diameters made of spruce. The strips of spruce are harvested by specialists called "sanglier". It is often served warmed in its original packaging and eaten like fondue.

Officially, the French AOC/PDO allows Artisanal and Coopérative production of Mont d'Or. There are 11 producers of Vacherin in France (2009).

Swiss Vacherin Mont d'Or is protected since 2003, by an AOC, and since 2013, by an AOP.

== See also ==
- List of cheeses
- List of French cheeses
- List of Swiss cheeses
- Culinary Heritage of Switzerland
