= Tomme Vaudoise =

Swiss soft cheese

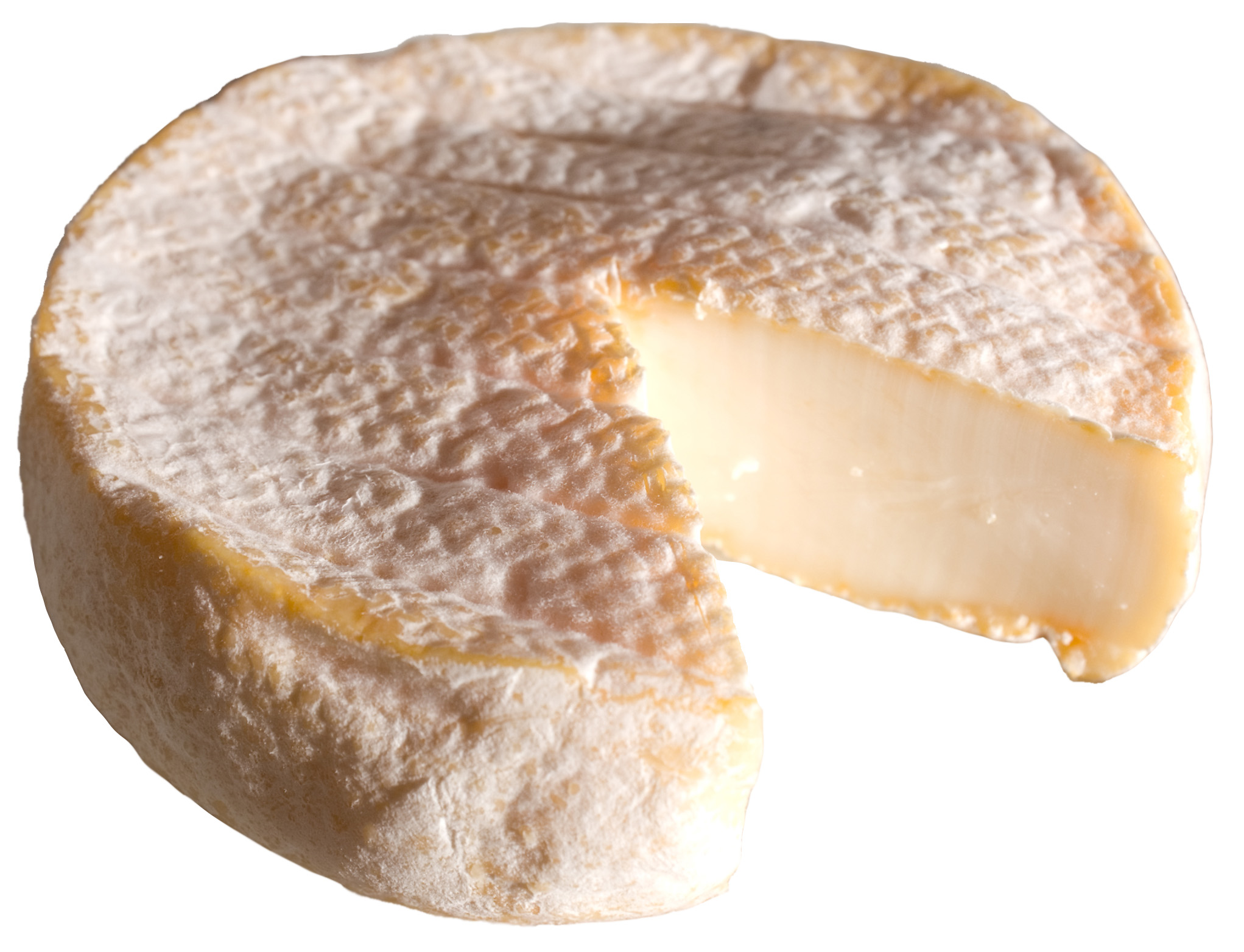
- Country of origin: Switzerland
- Region: Vaud
- Source of milk: unpasteurised cows' milk cheese
- Pasteurised: no
- Texture: soft
- Aging time: up to 8 weeks

Tomme Vaudoise (French pronunciation: [tɔm vodwaz]) is a Swiss soft cheese from the French part of Switzerland. It is a soft, unpasteurised cows' milk cheese from the cantons of Vaud and Geneva.

== See also ==
- Culinary Heritage of Switzerland
- List of Swiss cheeses
