= Alice Roth =

Swiss mathematician

Alice Roth (6 February 1905 – 22 July 1977) was a Swiss mathematician who invented the Swiss cheese set and made significant contributions to approximation theory. She was born, lived and died in Bern, Switzerland.

== Life ==
Alice attended the Höhere Töchterschule of Zürich, a municipal school for higher education for girls. After graduation in 1924 she studied mathematics, physics and astronomy at ETH Zurich under George Pólya. She graduated with a diploma in 1930. Her Master's thesis was titled "Extension of Weierstrass's Approximation Theorem to the complex plane and to an infinite interval". After that, she was a teacher at multiple high schools for girls in the Zurich area while continuing working with Pólya at ETH. In 1938 she became the second woman to graduate with a PhD from ETH. Her PhD Thesis was titled "Properties of approximations and radial limits of meromorphic and entire functions" and was so well regarded that it received a monetary prize and the ETH silver medal. Her supervisors were George Pólya and Heinz Hopf.

From 1940 she was mathematics and physics teacher at Humboldtianum in Bern, a private school. It was only after her retirement in 1971 that she returned to mathematical research, again in the area of complex approximation. She published three papers on her own, as well as a shared paper with Paul Gauthier of the University of Montreal and Harvard University professor Joseph L. Walsh. In 1975, at the age of 70, she was invited to give a public lecture at the University of Montreal.

In 1976 she was diagnosed with cancer, and she died the next year.

== Contribution to mathematics ==
One of the main results of Roth's 1938 thesis was an example of a compact set on which not every continuous function can by approximated uniformly by rational functions. This set, now known as the "Swiss cheese," was forgotten and independently rediscovered in 1952 in Russia by Mergelyan, and proper credit was restored by 1969.

The following excerpt by her former student, Peter Wilker, appeared in an obituary he wrote after her death: "In Switzerland, as elsewhere, women mathematicians are few and far between.... Alice Roth's dissertation was awarded a medal from the ETH, and appeared shortly after its completion in a Swiss mathematical journal....One year later war broke out, the world had other worries than mathematics, and Alice Roth's work was simply forgotten. So completely forgotten that around 1950 a Russian mathematician re-discovered similar results without having the slightest idea that a young Swiss woman mathematician had published the same ideas more than a decade before he did. However, her priority was recognized."

Roth developed other important results during her brief return to research at the end of her life: "Roth's past as well as future work was to have a strong and lasting influence on mathematicians working in this area [rational approximation theory]. Her Swiss cheese has been modified (to an entire variety of cheeses).... Roth's Fusion Lemma, which appeared in her 1976 paper...influenced a new generation of mathematicians worldwide."

== Lecture series and movie ==
ETH Zürich's Department of Mathematics now sponsors the annual Alice Roth Lecture Series to honor women with outstanding achievements in mathematics. The inaugural lecture was delivered in March 2022 by number theorist and later Fields medalist Maryna Viazovska, who spoke on "Fourier interpolation pairs and their applications". The Spring 2023 lecture will be given by harmonic analyst Gigliola Staffilani.

ETH Zürich has also produced an 8 minute documentary movie about Alice Roth's life and work.
