= Switzerland (disambiguation) =

Switzerland is a country in Europe.

Switzerland may also refer to:

== Places ==
- Switzerland, Florida, an unincorporated community
- Switzerland County, Indiana
- Switzerland Township, Monroe County, Ohio, a civil township
- Switzerland, South Carolina
- Switzerland Island, an artificial island of The World archipelago in the United Arab Emirates

== Other uses ==
- Switzerland (album), a 2006 album by Electric Six
- Switzerland (software), a packet monitor tool for ISP testing
- Switzerland (2020 film), an Indian Bengali-language family drama film
- Switzerland (upcoming film), an upcoming thriller film

== See also ==
- Bohemian Switzerland, a region in the north-western Czech Republic
- Franconian Switzerland, an upland in Upper Franconia, northern Bavaria
- Holstein Switzerland, a hilly area in Schleswig-Holstein, Germany
- Little Switzerland (disambiguation)
- Norman Switzerland, a hilly area in Normandy, France
- Saxon Switzerland, a mountainous area and national park near Dresden in Saxony, Germany
- Šveicarija (Lithuanian for "Switzerland"), a village in Lithuania
