= Ziger =

Swiss whey cheese

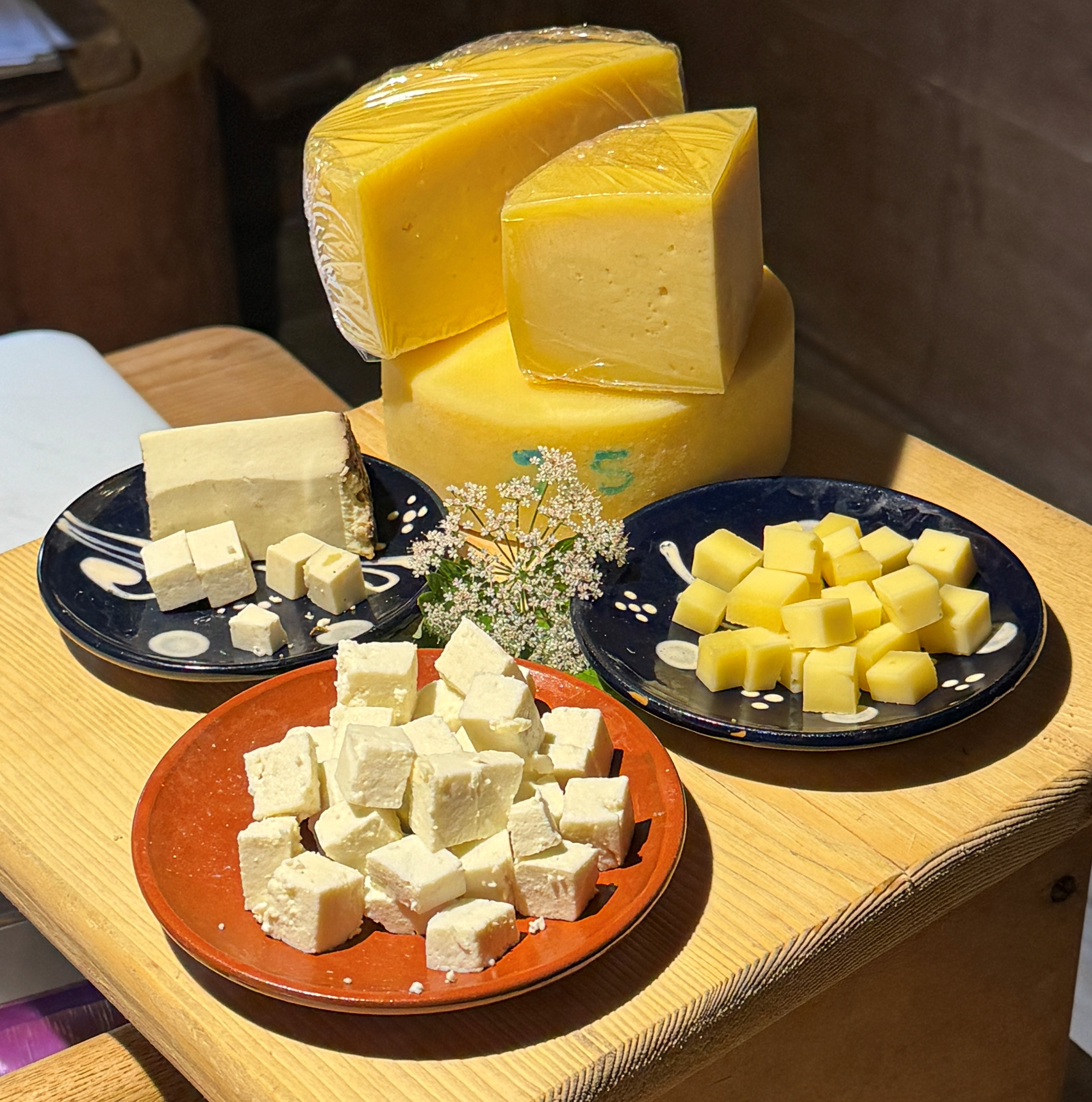
Ziger (left) is a byproduct of the manufacture of hard cheese (Mutschli, right).

Ziger (German), sérac (French) and ricotta (Italian) is a group of fresh cheeses produced in Switzerland. Ziger is nationally widespread, as it is the by-product of the manufacture of hard Swiss-type cheeses, such as Gruyère and Emmental. Made of whey, it is rich in protein and is historically a staple food in the Alpine regions.

== History ==
Ricotta production has been documented in Italy back to the Bronze Age. The name ricotta ("boiled again") refers to the use of whey that remains after the production of cheese; the whey is acidified and boiled again and the proteins still contained in the whey (lactoglobulins; casein is no longer there) coagulate and precipitate as curds. The French term sérac or séré is mentioned among other cheeses in a Gruyère document dating from 1312. In Valais, it is mentioned in a document from 1437. This appellation, however, might have been associated with another type of fresh cheese which was not a by-product, but a domestically made cheese. The Schabziger, from Glarus, is an example of such fresh cheese. Ziger, as a peasant staple food produced from whey, appears in literature from the Renaissance. Several writings from the 18th and 19th centuries also show that, at that time, Ziger was close to what we know today. From the 20th century, the consumption of Ziger declined owing to an increase in purchasing power. Today, its production is very small compared to other Swiss cheeses.

In Ticino, Ziger is known as ricotta, mascarpa, or zigra, and it has been produced there at least since the late Middle Ages (but, as written above, ricotta was produced in Italy since the Bronze age). In the Val Bedretto (Leventina), eating lunch is called züfé, literally "eating fresh ricotta", an expression that indicates the monotony of the diet of the mountain dwellers in the past.

== Production ==
About 40 liters of milk are needed to produce 1 kg of Ziger. Today, whey is obtained after curdling the milk using rennet and selected lactic acid bacteria. It is then heated to around 90 °C. The precipitation of whey proteins is obtained by lowering the pH, or by adding acid (lactic, acetic, or citric). The solid parts are then collected using a strainer and poured into pierced molds in which the product is left to drain and firm up. The product is ready to be sold the following day.

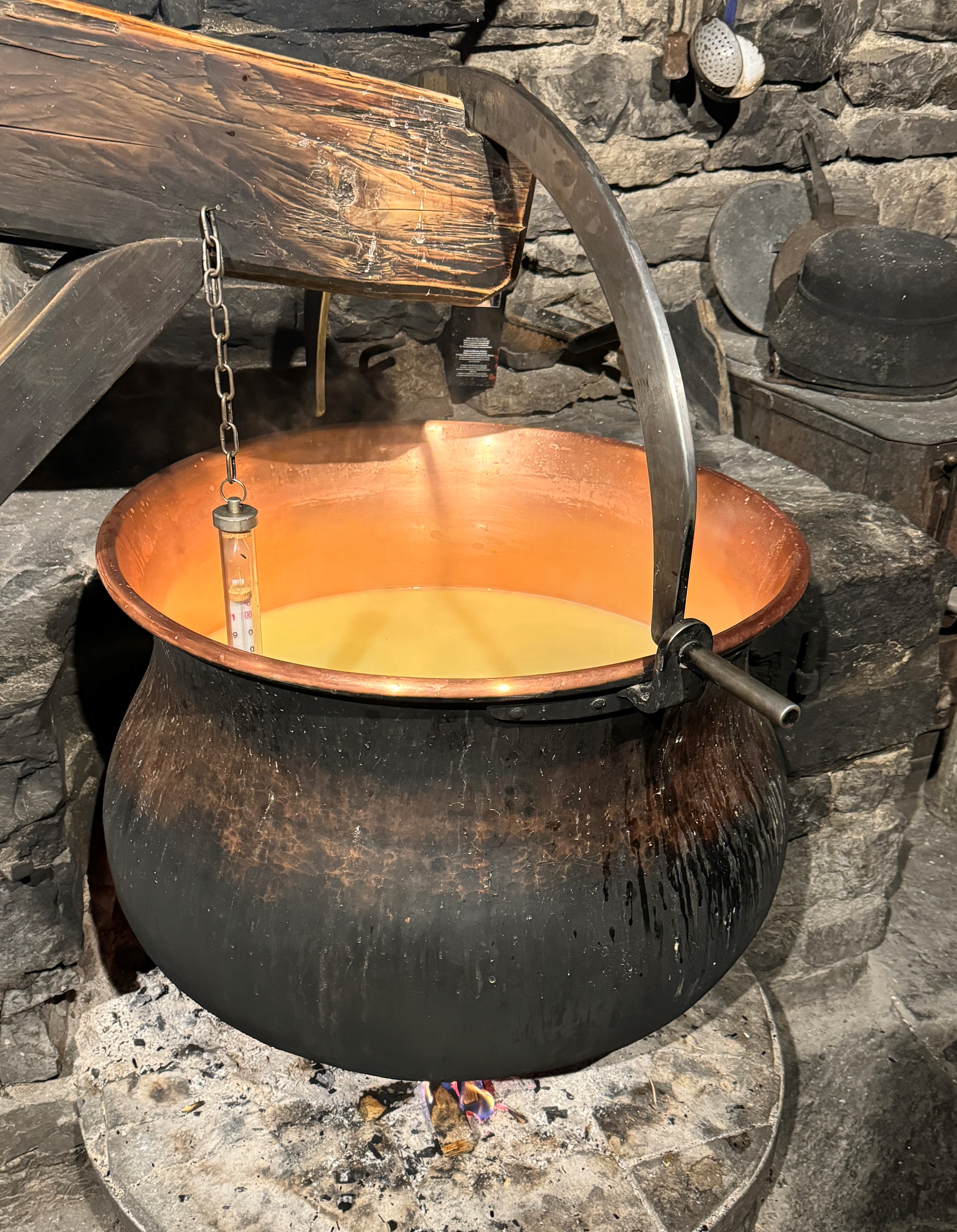
Traditional artisanal manufacture of Ziger at Ballenberg museum. The whey is first heated to 90°C.

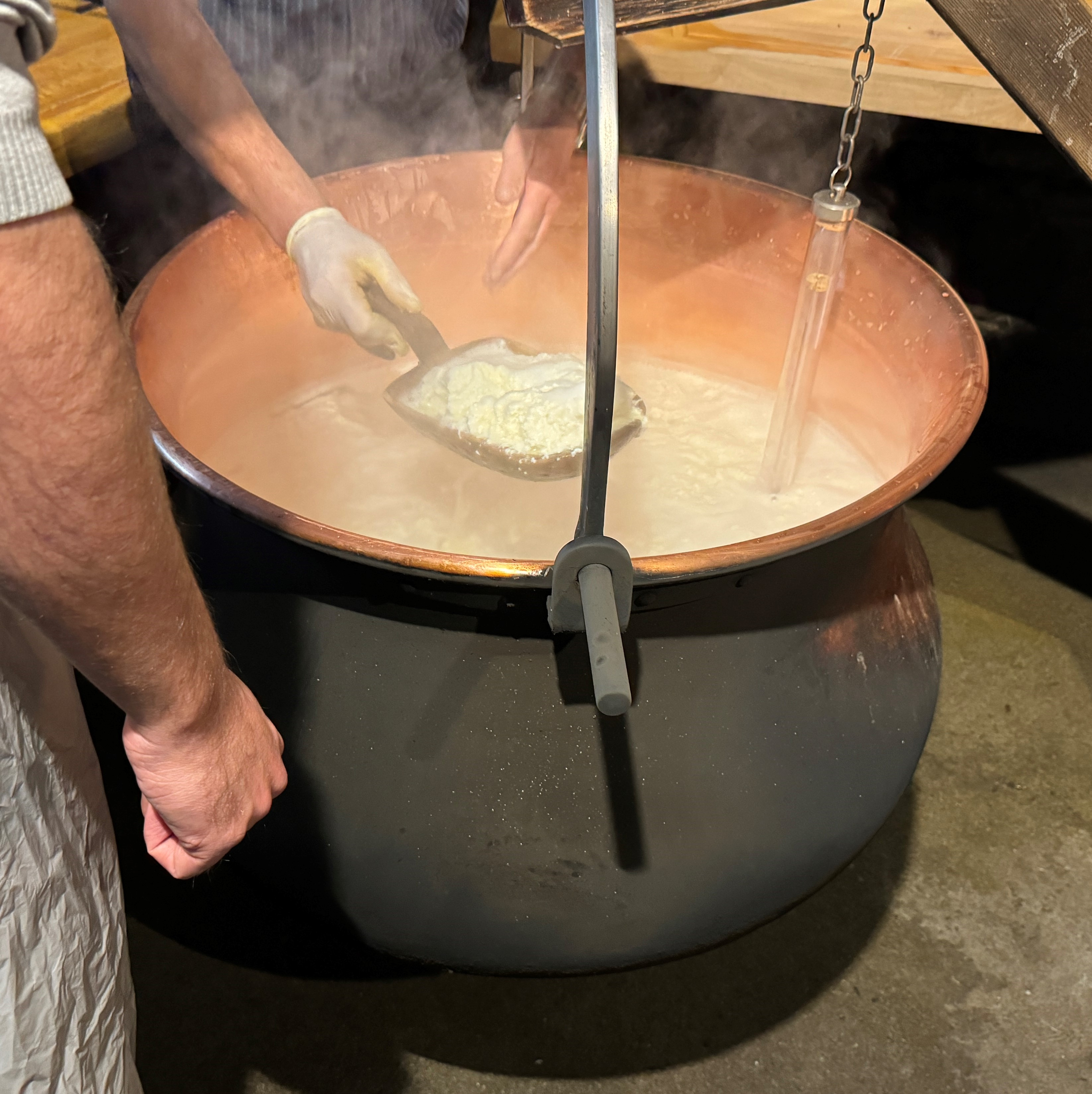
After acetic acid is added, cheese curds form and are removed with a wooden pail.

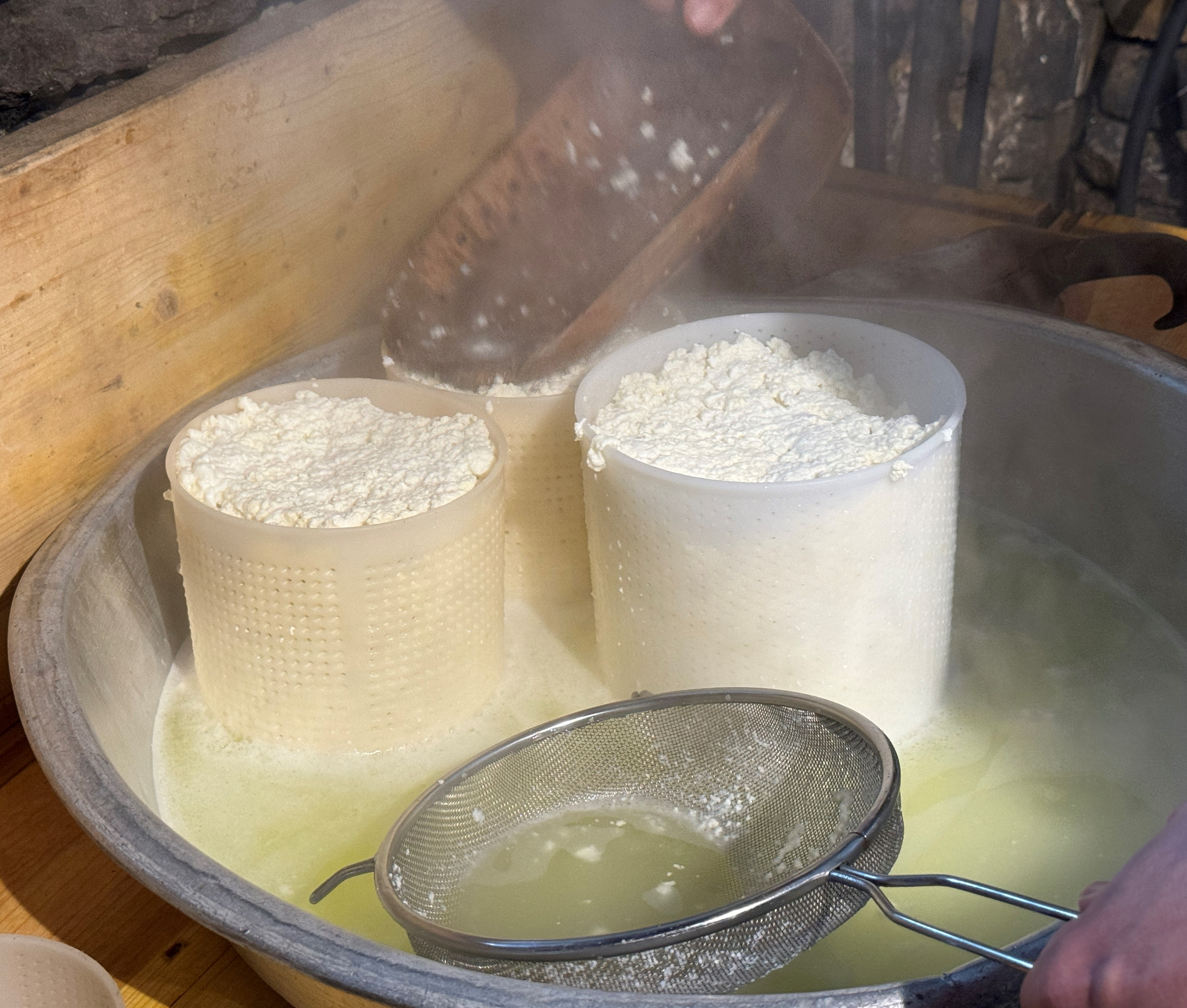
The curds are poured into pierced molds.

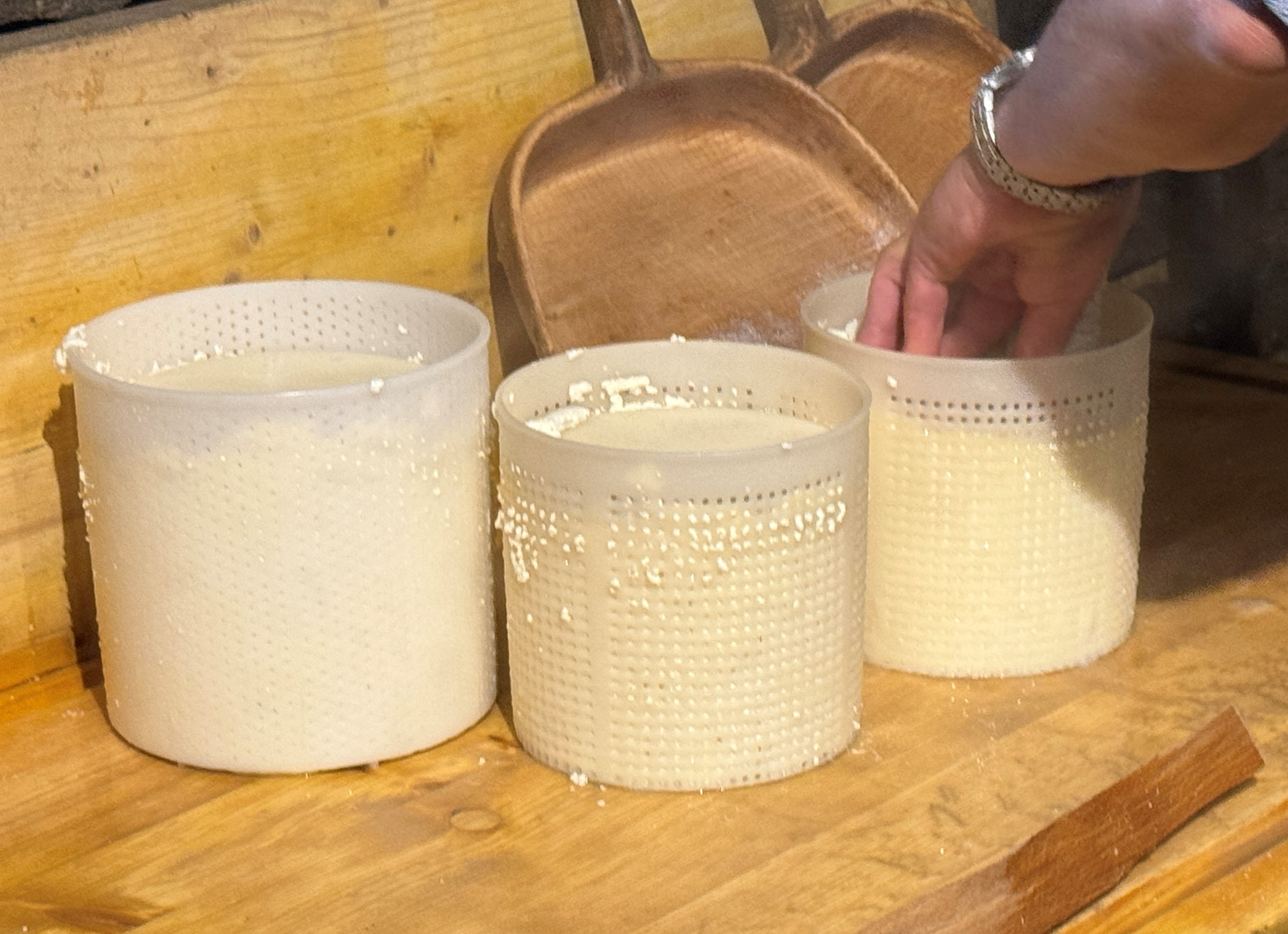
They are then slightly compressed and left alone for about a day, after which the cheese is ready to be eaten.

== Use ==
Since Ziger has little taste, it is generally sprinkled with salt and pepper, whether it is eaten fresh or fried. It is also used in baking, notably for Zigerkrapfen, which are fritters filled with a sweet and flavored Ziger filling. These are made since the 18th century and are particularly popular in central Switzerland.

== See also ==
- Whey cheese
- Swiss cheeses and dairy products
