= Schabziger =

Swiss whey cheese

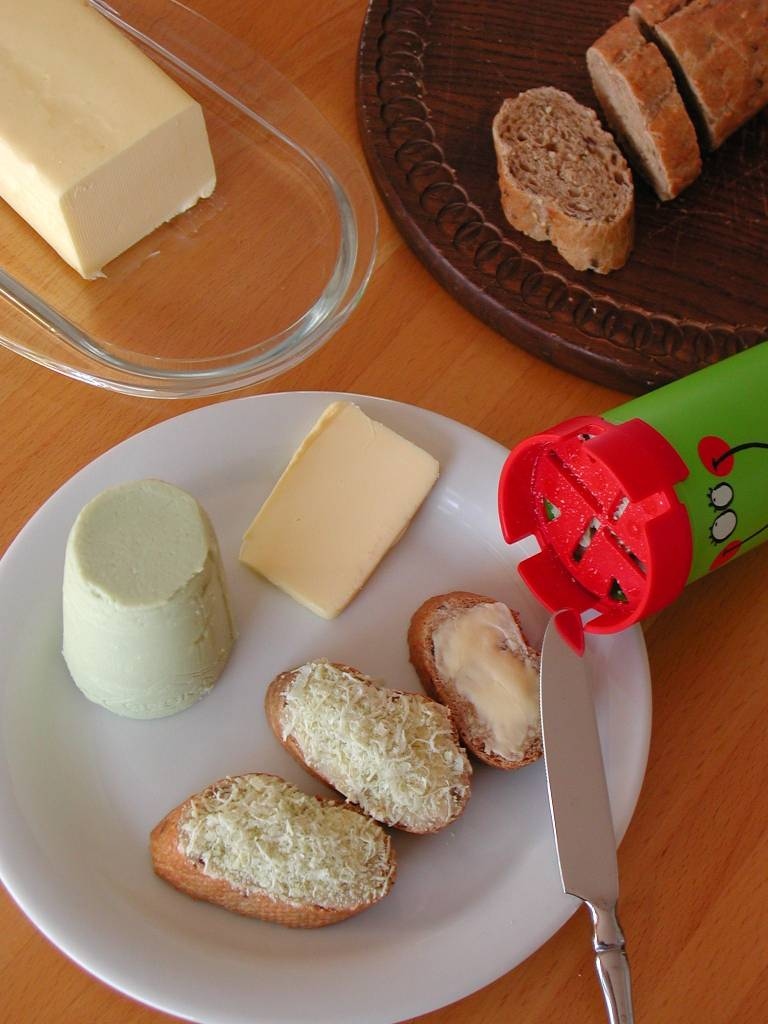
- Country of origin: Switzerland
- Region, town: Glarus
- Source of milk: Cows
- Pasteurized: No
- Texture: Hard
- Aging time: 2 - 6 months
- Certification: Since 1463

Schabziger (German pronunciation: [ˈʃaptsɪgɐ]), sérac or sapsago is a traditional cheese exclusively produced in the Canton of Glarus in Switzerland. Schabziger is made out of skimmed cow milk and a special kind of herb, blue fenugreek (Trigonella caerulea), also called blue melilot.

The milk and melilot sap are heated to 32 °C (90 °F), then an acid (lactic, citric or acetic) is added causing curdling. The whey and curd are separated. The whey is further curdled at 90 °C (194 °F) and separated. The whey-condensate is called Ziger and is pressed into cones for 6 to 8 days. The cones are then dried for 2 to 6 months.

The resulting cheese is hard, green with a strong flavor and aroma. It is usually conditioned as cones of 100 g (3.5 oz) with a height of 5 cm (2.0 in). It contains less than 3% fat.

Schabziger is usually eaten grated, or mixed with butter to make an herb spread ("Ankeziger", "Zigerbutter") that is put on bread or sandwiches. It can also be used in fondue (Zigerfondue), or grated and eaten with noodles (Zigerhörnli) or rösti. A cone of Schabziger can be conserved for weeks in the fridge.

Schabziger was first mentioned in connection to its sale on the markets of Zurich in 1429. The exact specification on how to make this cheese was laid down during a Landsgemeinde in 1463. The cheese also has to bear a stamp of origin, making it one of the earliest protected brands.

Schabziger is produced exclusively by Geska (Gesellschaft Schweizer Kräuterkäse-Fabrikanten). Abroad it is sold under the name Swiss Green Cheese. In the US it is also sold under the brand Sap Sago. Sap Sago was introduced into New York pharmacies in the 19th century. The name is a corruption of the German word Schabziger, though folk etymology has it that the green herb juice used to make the cheese was called "sap", as in tree sap.

== See also ==
- Ziger
- Culinary Heritage of Switzerland
