= Little Switzerland =

Little Switzerland may refer to:

== In Switzerland ==
- The Grisons, the largest and most diverse canton of Switzerland

== Outside Switzerland ==
- Little Switzerland (landscape), an area of scenic beauty
- Little Switzerland (Luxembourg), a region of Luxembourg
- Little Switzerland (Lynton & Lynmouth), an area of Exmoor in Devon, England, UK
- Little Switzerland (Shorewood Hills, Arkansas), US
- Little Switzerland, North Carolina, US
- Little Switzerland (Wisconsin), a ski area in Wisconsin, US

== See also ==
- Bariloche, a planned city in the Argentine Andes
- HC Klein Zwitserland, a hockey club from the Hague
- Ifrane, a Moroccan town in the Middle Atlas built by the French colonial administration
