= Swiss cheese plant =

Swiss cheese plant may refer to:

- Monstera deliciosa, a species of flowering plant native to tropical forests of southern Mexico, south to Panama
- Monstera adansonii, a species of flowering plant widespread across much of South America and Central America
