= Swiss cheese (mathematics) =

Compact subset of the complex plane

In mathematics, a Swiss cheese is a compact subset of the complex plane obtained by removing from a closed disc some countably infinite union of open discs, usually with some restriction on the centres and radii of the removed discs. Traditionally the deleted discs should have pairwise disjoint closures which are subsets of the interior of the starting disc, the sum of the radii of the deleted discs should be finite, and the Swiss cheese should have empty interior. This is the type of Swiss cheese originally introduced by the Swiss mathematician Alice Roth.

More generally, a Swiss cheese may be all or part of Euclidean space R^{n} – or of an even more complicated manifold – with "holes" in it.
