= Swiss-type cheeses =

Family of semi-hard cheeses

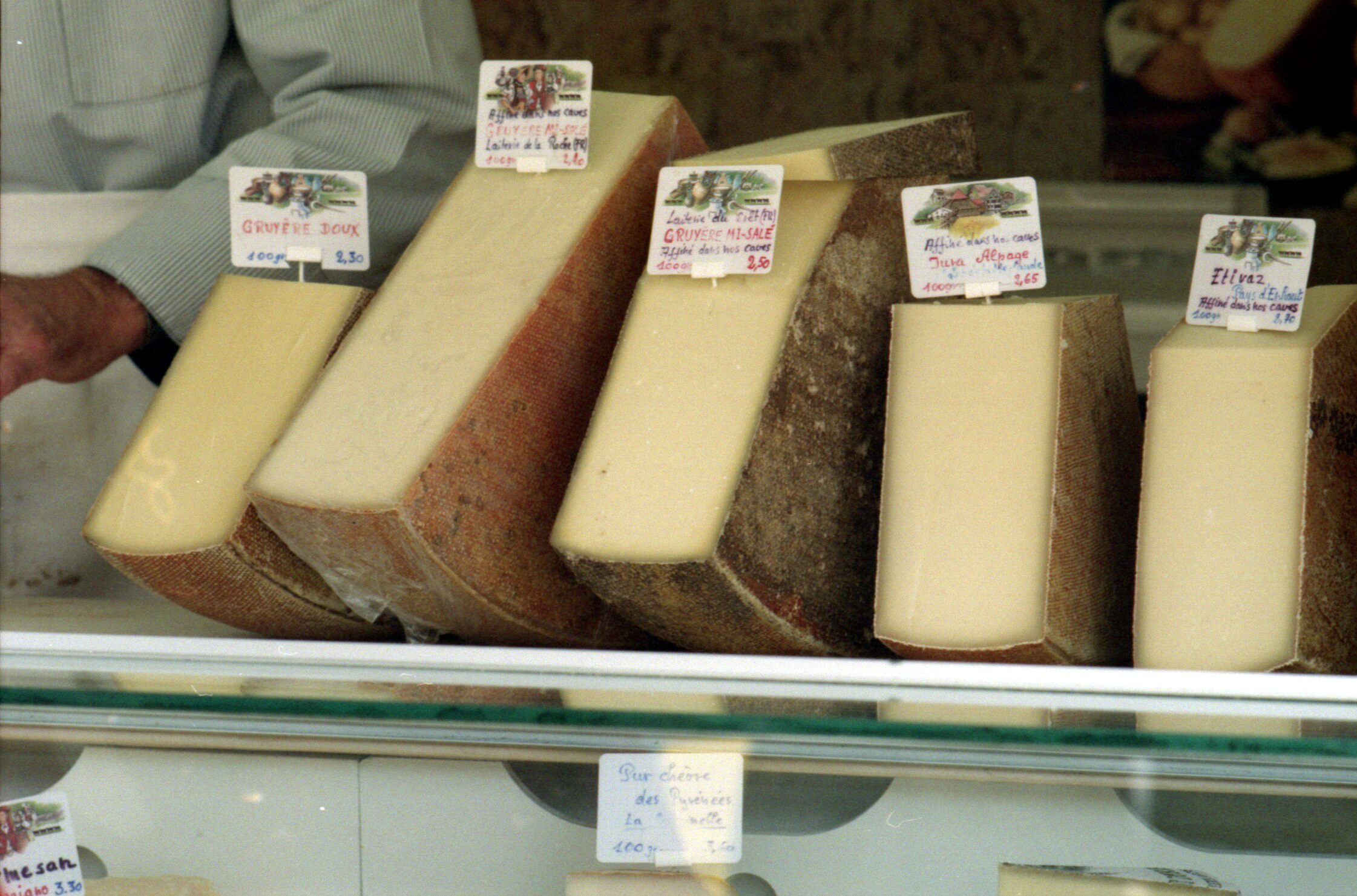
Five different Swiss Alpine cheeses on sale in Lausanne

Swiss-type cheeses, also known as Alpine cheeses, are a group of hard or semi-hard cheeses with a distinct character, whose origins lie in the Alps of Europe, although they are now eaten and imitated in most cheesemaking parts of the world. Their distinct character arose from the requirements of cheese made in the summer on high Alpine grasslands (alpage in French), and then transported with the cows down to the valleys in the winter, in the historic culture of Alpine transhumance. Traditionally the cheeses were made in large rounds or "wheels" with a hard rind, and were robust enough for both keeping and transporting.

The best-known cheeses of the type, all made from cow's milk, include the Swiss Emmental, Gruyère and Appenzeller, as well as the French Beaufort and Comté (from the Jura Mountains, near the Alps). Both countries have many other traditional varieties, as do the Alpine regions of Austria (Alpkäse) and Italy (Asiago and Montasio), though these have not achieved the same degree of intercontinental fame. Jarlsberg cheese originated in 19th-century Norway and is made using similar methods to Emmental. Maasdam cheese is a Dutch version, devised in the late 20th century. All of these are widely exported. In North America and some other areas outside Europe, Emmental is the best known, and is commonly called simply "Swiss cheese". However, in Switzerland itself more Gruyère is consumed, and in continental Europe Gruyère, a name with a considerably longer history, tends to be thought of as the archetypal Swiss cheese, with for example "Gruyère de Comté" being another name for Comté.

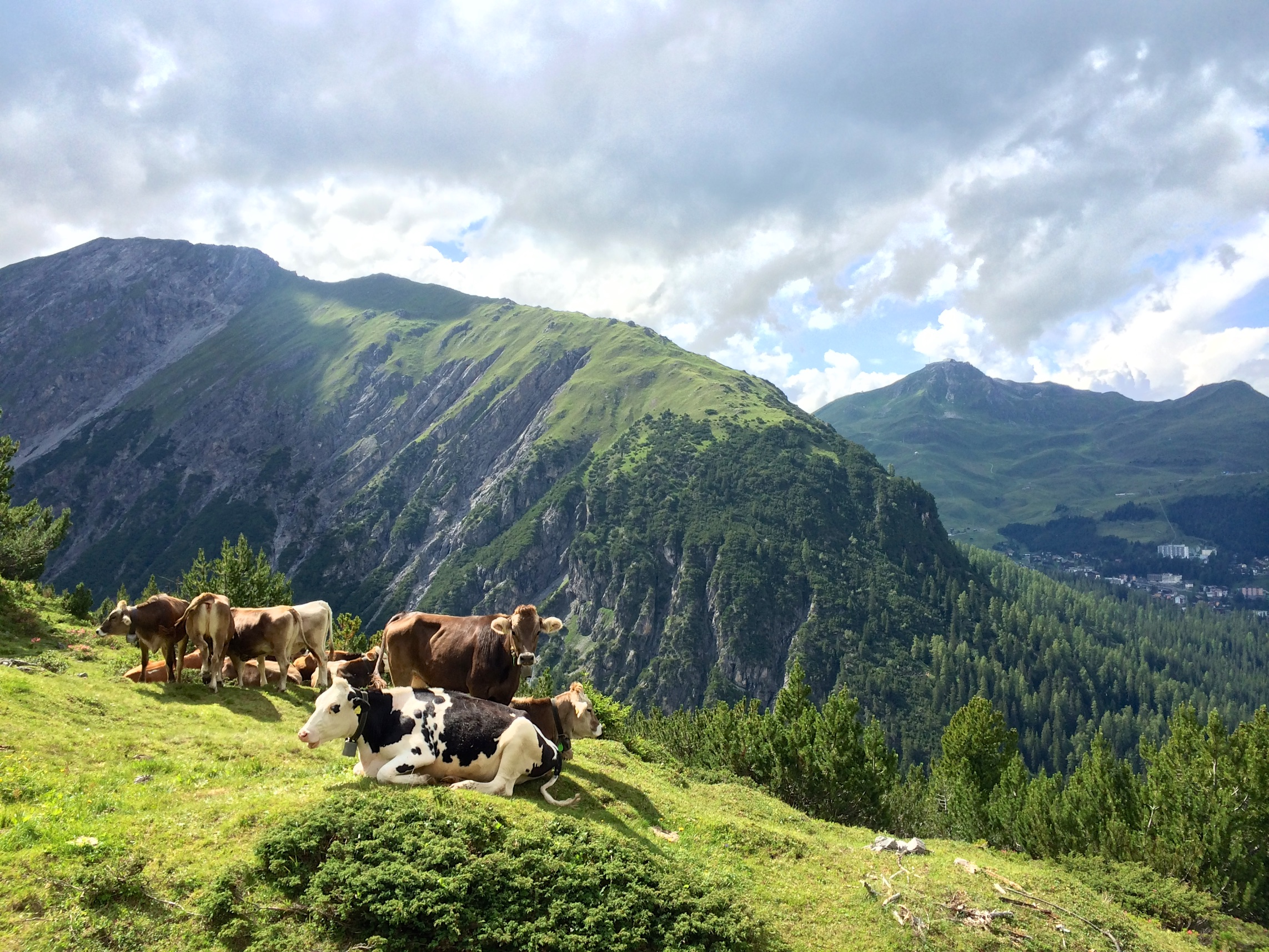
Swiss Brown cattle grazing on alpage pastures

Technically, Swiss-type cheeses are "cooked", meaning made using thermophilic lactic fermentation starters, incubating the curd with a period at a high temperature of 45°C or more. Since they are later pressed to expel excess moisture, the group are also described as "'cooked pressed cheeses'", fromages à pâte pressée cuite in French. Most varieties have few if any holes or "eyes", or holes that are much smaller than the large holes found in some Emmental or its imitations. The general eating characteristics of the cheeses are a firm but still elastic texture, flavour that is not sharp, acidic or salty, but rather nutty and buttery. When melted, which they often are in cooking, they are "gooey", and "slick, stretchy and runny".

A number of traditional types have legally controlled standards, for example the Appellation d'origine protégée in Switzerland, often covering the permitted breeds of cow, pastures, location and method of making, period of maturation, as well as details of their food chemistry. Most global modern production is industrial, with little control of these. This is usually made in rectangular blocks, and by wrapping in plastic no rind is allowed to form. Historical production was all with "raw" milk, although the periods of high heat in making largely controlled unwelcome bacteria, but modern production may use thermized or pasteurized milk.

== Cheesemaking ==
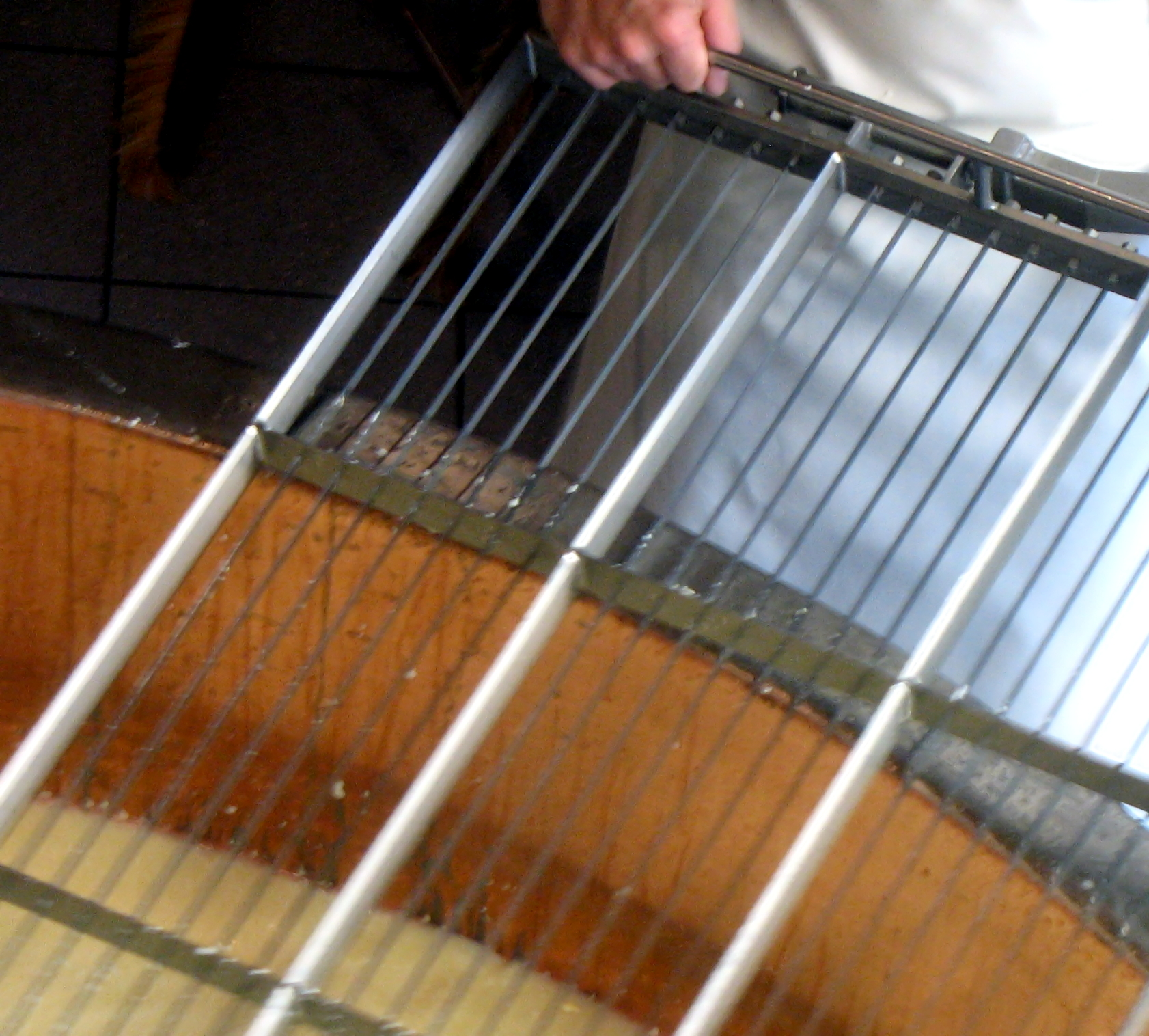
"Cheese harp" for cutting the curd of Gruyère cheese made in Gruyère

The cheesemaking process reflects the needs of Alpine transhumant makers. At the high summer slopes timber to "cook" the cheese was abundant, but salt had to be carried up, and was expensive, so little is used compared to many other cheese types. Cantal cheese in the Auvergne region of France, took a different approach, with much less heat, more salt, and more pressing. This became used for Cheddar cheese and other similar English varieties.

Alpine cheeses are made to be aged, typically at least for a few months, but often much more. The cows reached the high slopes by about May, and remained until about October. Often they moved in stages as the snow retreated. The highest alpage suitable for grazing is at around 2,800 metres (9,200 ft). Cheese was made during this period, and mostly stored before bringing down in autumn. Often the same cows and herders made a different kind of cheese from winter milk, and protected varieties may require summer (or winter) milk.

The Alpine process introduced three innovations. Firstly "the curd was cut into small particles to facilitate whey expulsion", now done by stirring the cheese with a "cheese harp", a set of metal wires (in French tranche-caillé or lyre). Other types of cheese cut the curd, but not into such small particles. Then the curds were "cooked at high temperatures" and pressed, both reducing the moisture content. The presence of dust from hay leads to holes or "eyes" forming in the cheese, formerly attributed to bacterial growth. These were generally regarded as a fault if they were large, until 19th-century makers of Emmental began to encourage them, which proved to be highly effective from the marketing point of view. Swiss cheeses have fewer and smaller holes than they did in the past, due to production techniques which do not introduce hay dust. Traditional Alpine cheeses are made in copper (or at least copper-lined) vats or "kettles", which are mandatory for many protected varieties, but industrial cheese is often made in stainless steel, especially in North America, where the use of copper is outlawed. This has been suggested as one factor in the failure of North American cheeses to achieve the levels of flavour of the Alpine originals. In some places specific old copper vats can be "grandfathered" in.

== History ==
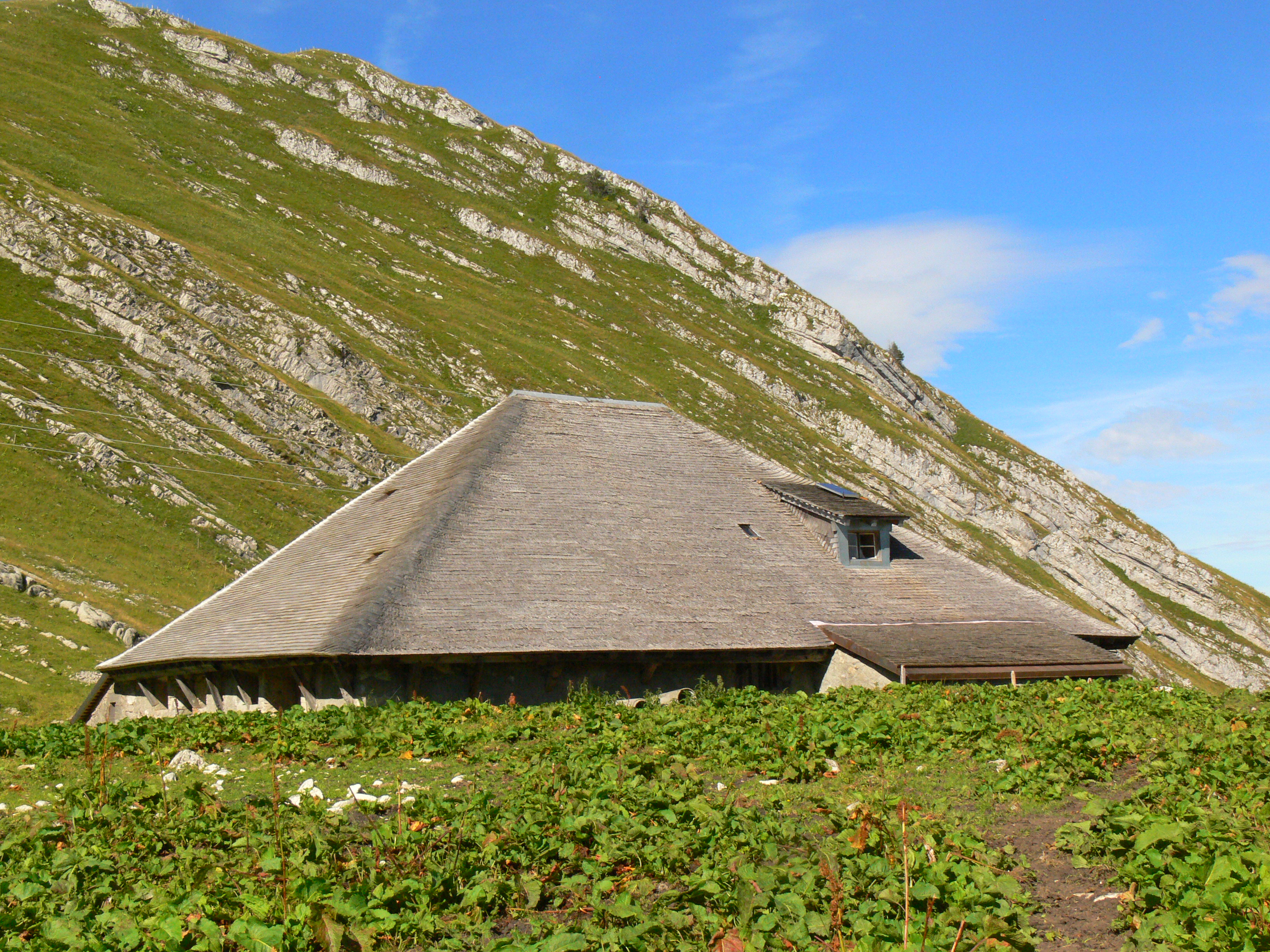
A traditional cheese-making chalet in the Gruyère valley alpage, Switzerland

According to the Historia Augusta, the Roman emperor Antoninus Pius fell ill and died in 161 after eating a large quantity of "Alpine cheese" ("cum Alpinum caseum in cena edisset avidius") at Lorium, near Rome. What the character of this cheese was is impossible to say, but it was evidently capable of being transported several hundred miles.

There is evidence that, in the Middle Ages, Alpine cheesemaking was encouraged by local monasteries who owned large tracts of little-used Alpine land, and took cheese as tithes, in effect rent. One of the largest was the Abbey of Saint Gall in Switzerland, which owned much of the Appenzell region from the 10th century on. Muri Abbey was founded in 1027 with a large donation of Alpine wilderness, which it settled by offering a starter pack of equipment and animals to peasant families. Cheesemaking soon became an important part of the new local economy, with the tithe cheeses delivered to the abbey each Feast of Saint Andrew, on 30 November. Typically, about a dozen households combined their herds for the summer season, appointing a head cowman, and constructing high chalets to make cheese in.

The very hard Italian "grana" cheeses are regarded as a related group; the best known are Parmesan and Grana Padano. Although their origins lie in the flat and (originally) swampy Po Valley, they share the broad Alpine cheesemaking process, and began after local monasteries initiated drainage programmes from the 11th century onwards. These were Benedictine and Cistercian monasteries, both with sister-houses benefiting from Alpine cheesemaking. They seem to have borrowed their techniques from them, but produced very different cheeses, using much more salt, and less heating, which suited the local availability of materials.

The Black Death in the mid-14th century hit the Alps hard, and promoted an increase in grazing with cows rather than sheep or goats. The Protestant Reformation, which swept Switzerland if not other Alpine regions, removed the monastic landlords, and also some restrictions on eating cheese during Lent (although these already did not apply north of the Alps). By the 16th century Alpine cheeses were becoming significant export products, and were found to cope well with long intercontinental sea voyages.

=== Natural holes in cheese ===
Some Swiss cheeses are characterised by having large holes in their body. The presence of holes in cheeses such as Gruyère and Emmental was long thought to be due to bacterial activity in the mass of the cheese. In the 21st century it was discovered that it was due to microscopic hay dust that got into the milk during milking. Bacteria formed around the dust particles and produced gases which caused the characteristic holes. In addition to their traditionally favoured appearance, the holes, if not too small, have the beneficial effect of preventing gaps and cracks in the block of cheese from forming. There was some suggestion in the past of a variable effect; Emmental cheese made from summer milk had smaller holes than winter cheese—the cows ate hay in winter, but grass with less dust in summer. Modern production techniques and milking machines are less susceptible to hay dust, and indeed 21st-century Swiss cheeses have fewer and smaller holes. Holes can be restored to their former size and prevalence by adding hay flower powder to the milk; this is done in Germany and France, but such additives are forbidden in Swiss cheeses.

== Cheesemaking gallery ==
Some of the stages in the traditional cheesemaking process of French Beaufort cheese, which would be very similar in other "cooked pressed" Alpine cheeses.

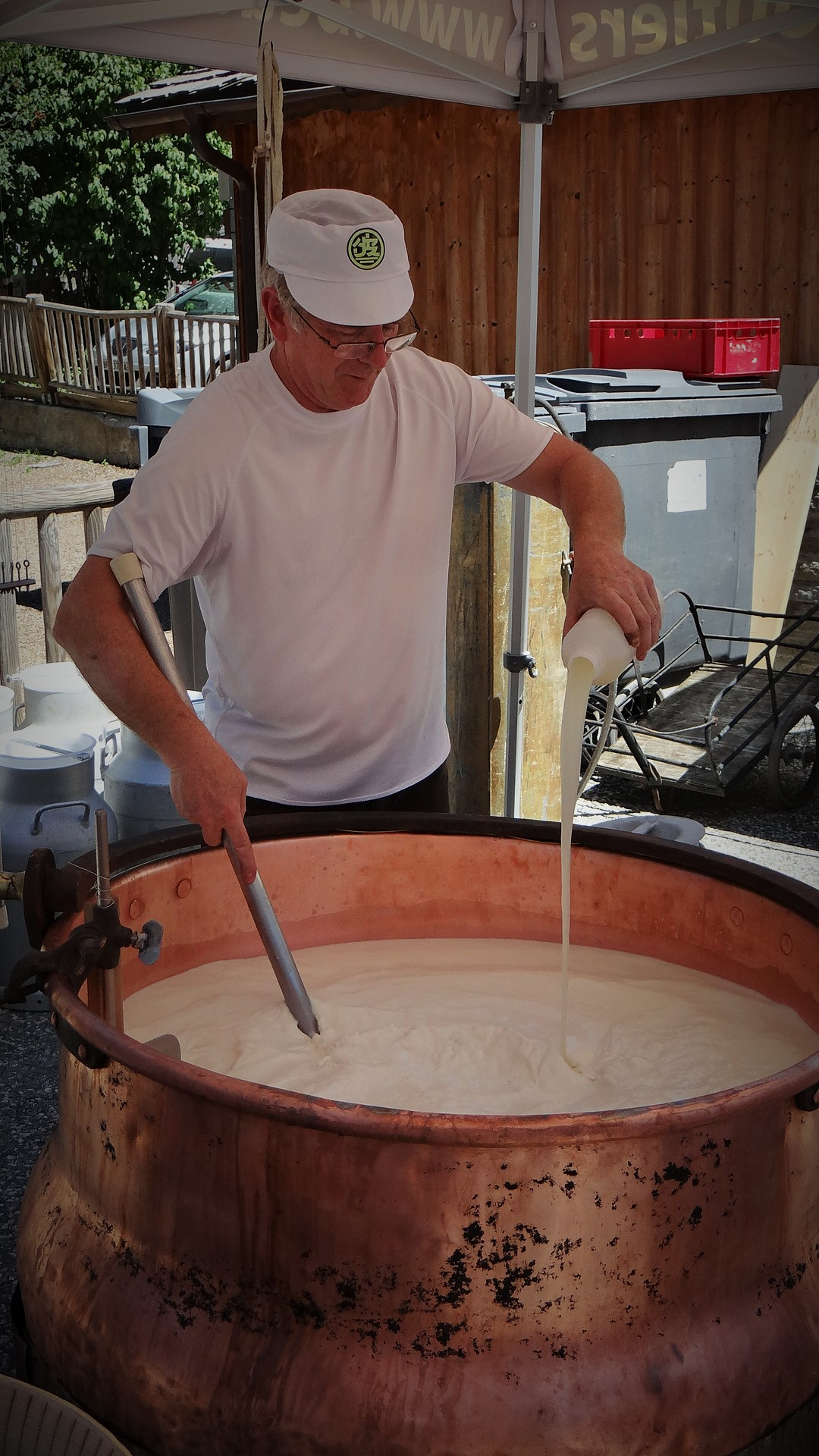
Adding the starter

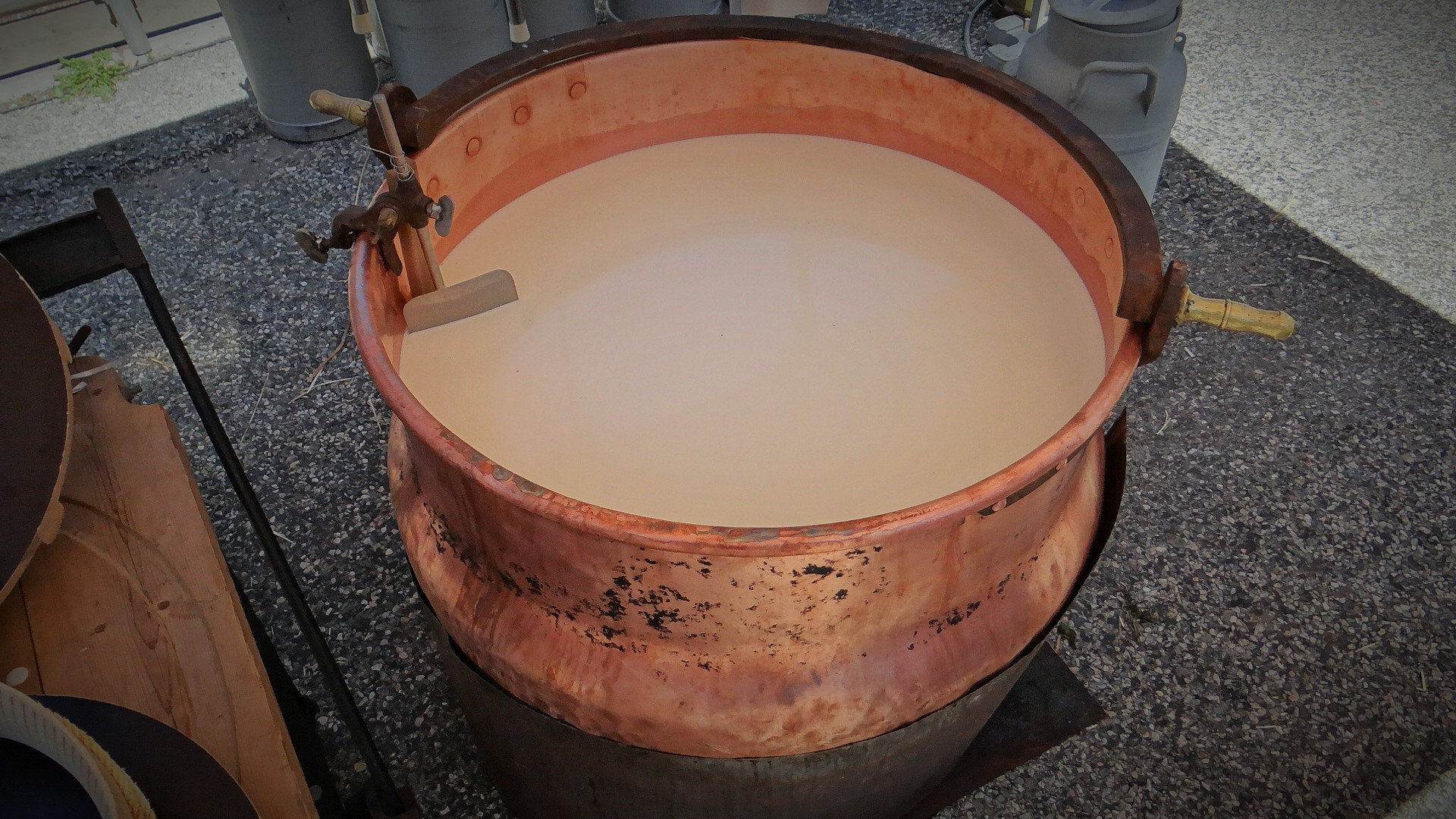
Reheating milk

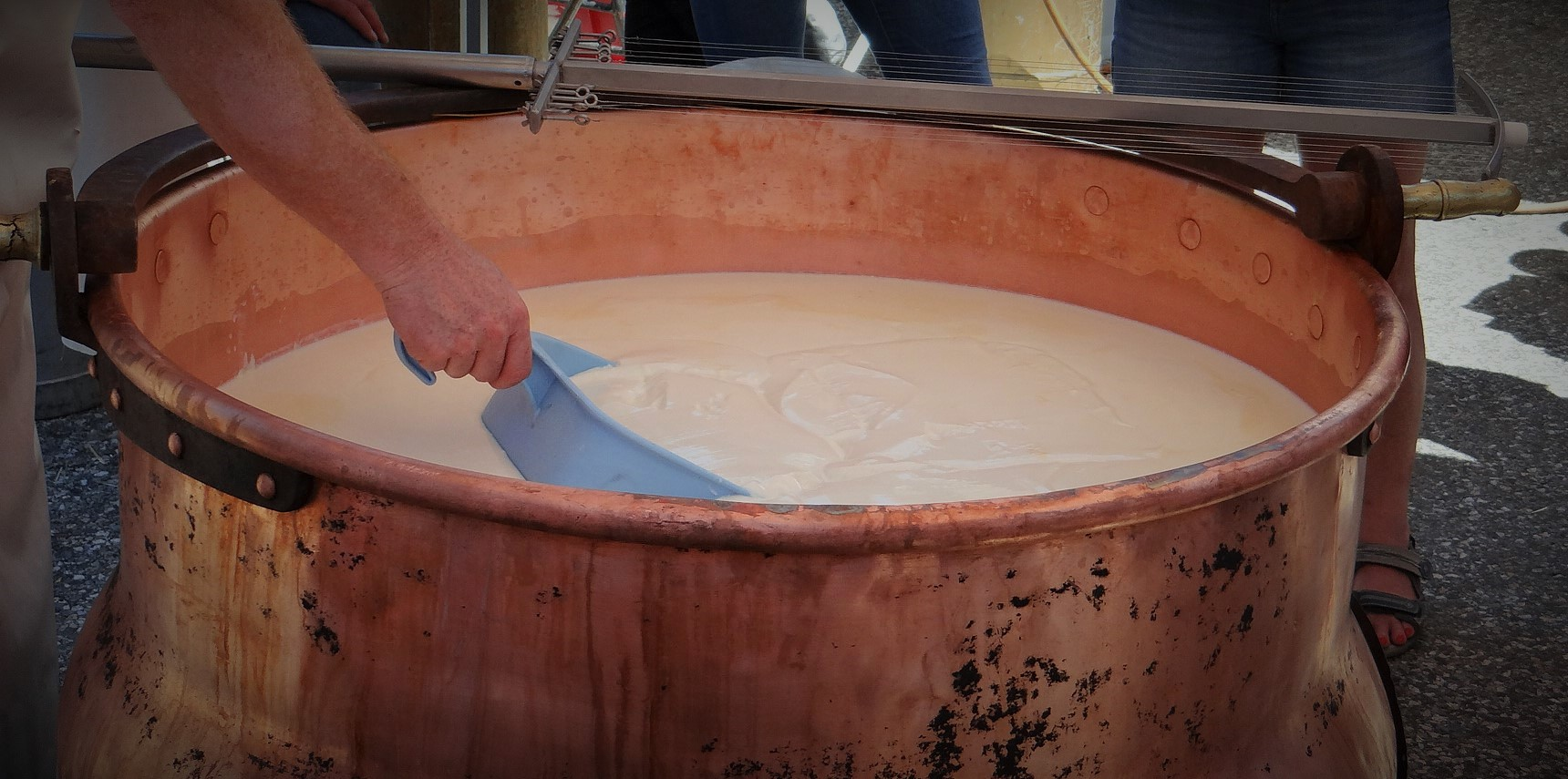
Milk curdling

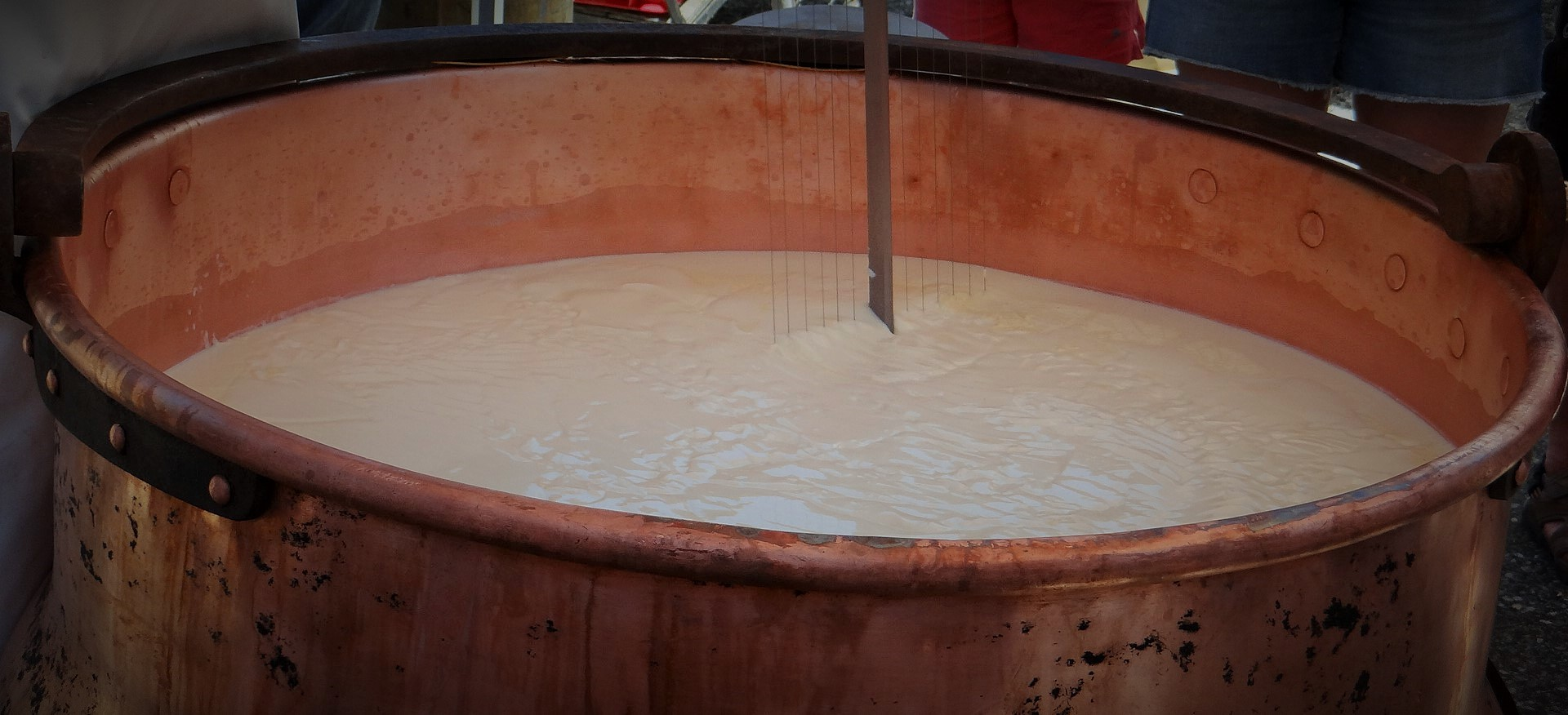
"Scaling", stirring with a set of wires to cut the curd

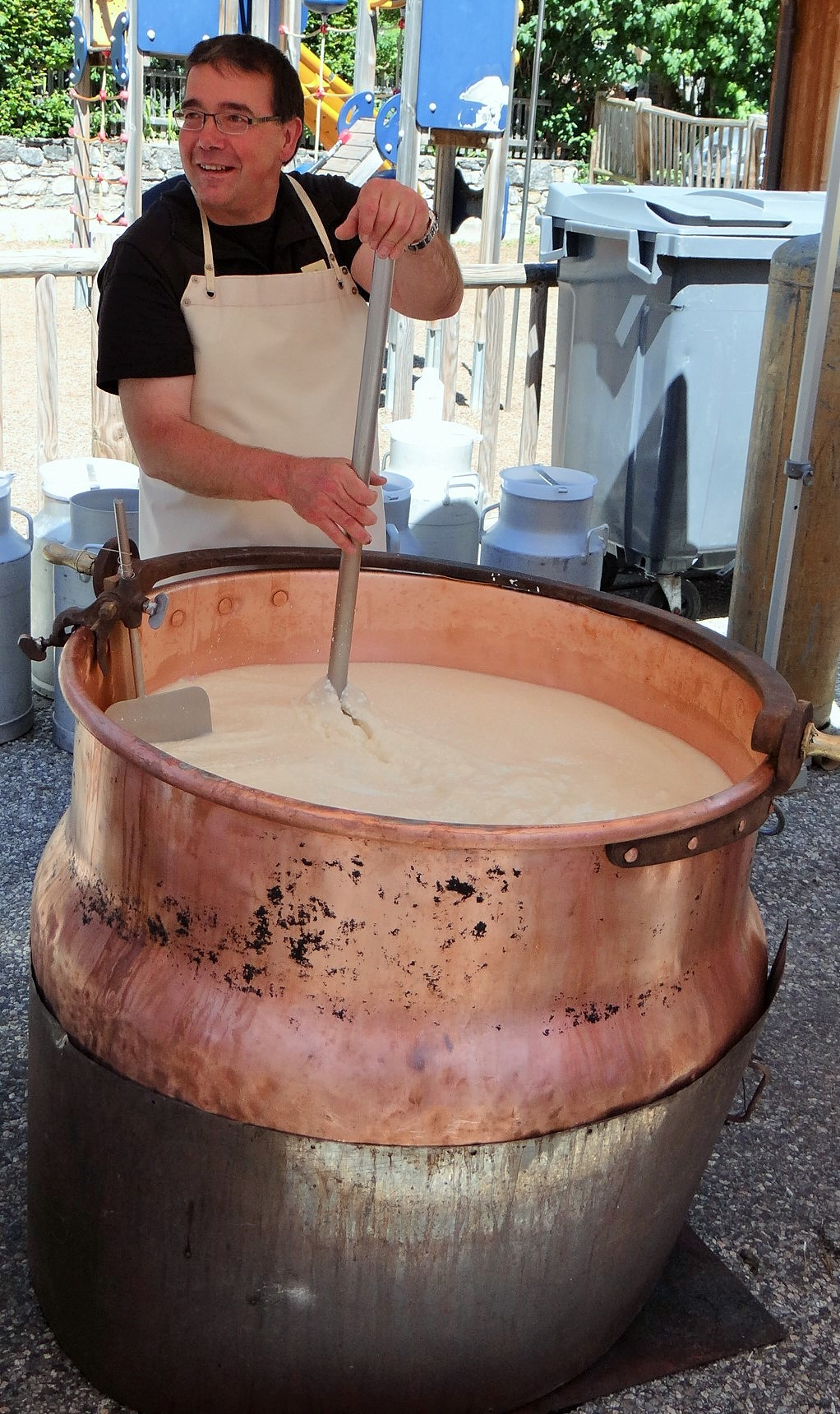
Heating and stirring

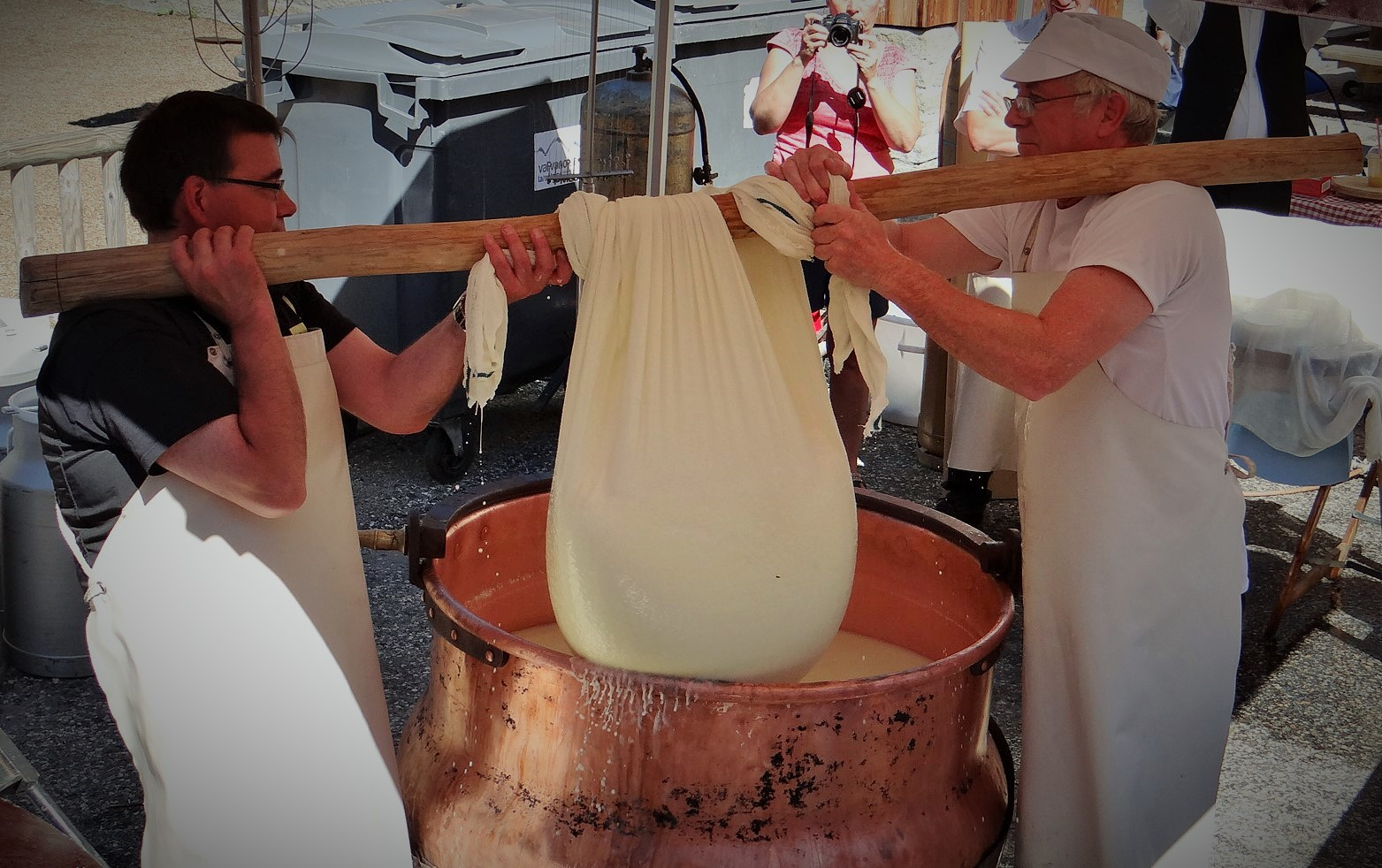
Mass of curd removed in linen cloth

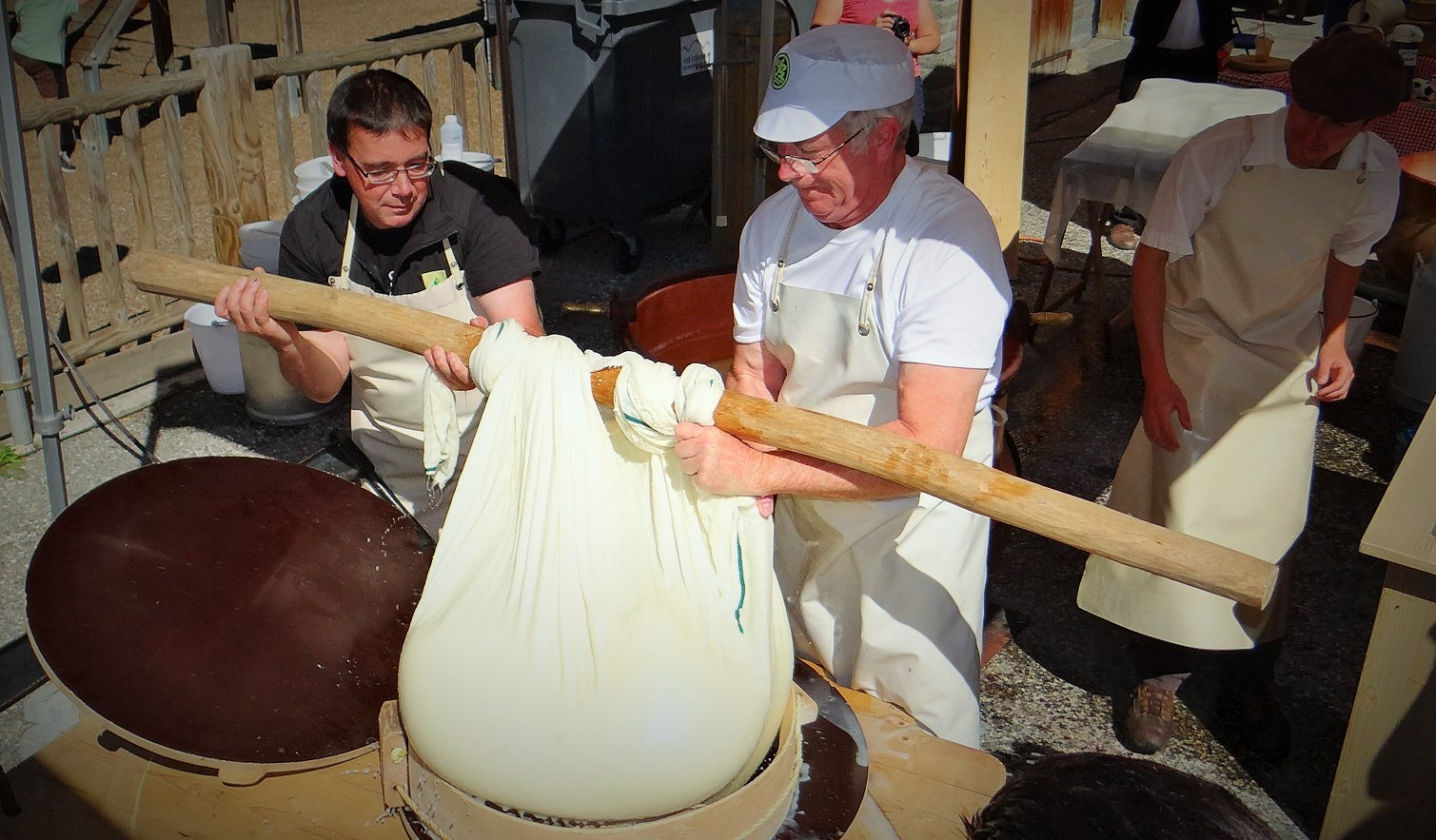
Putting into the beech wood mould

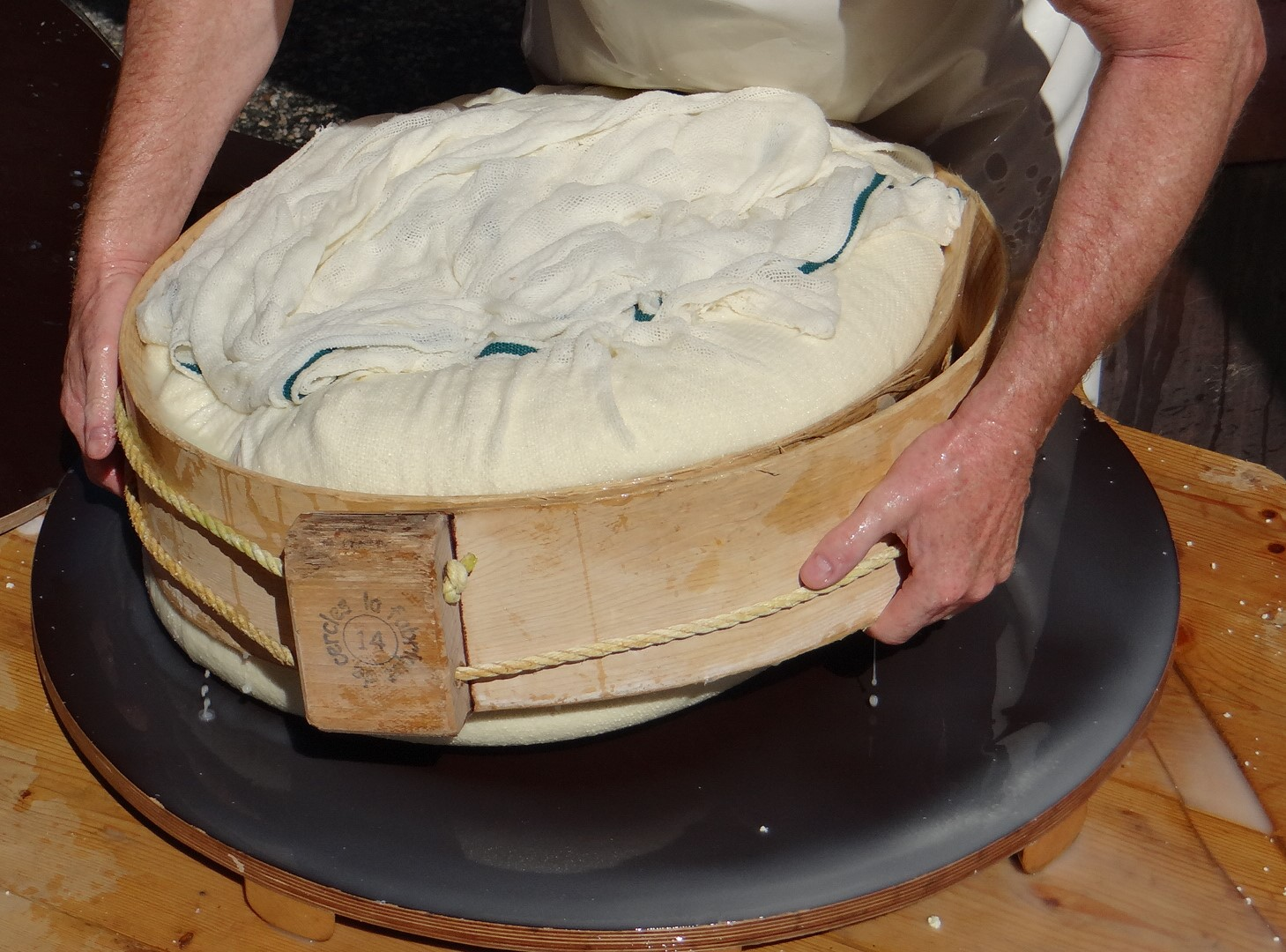
Moulding in a circle of beech wood

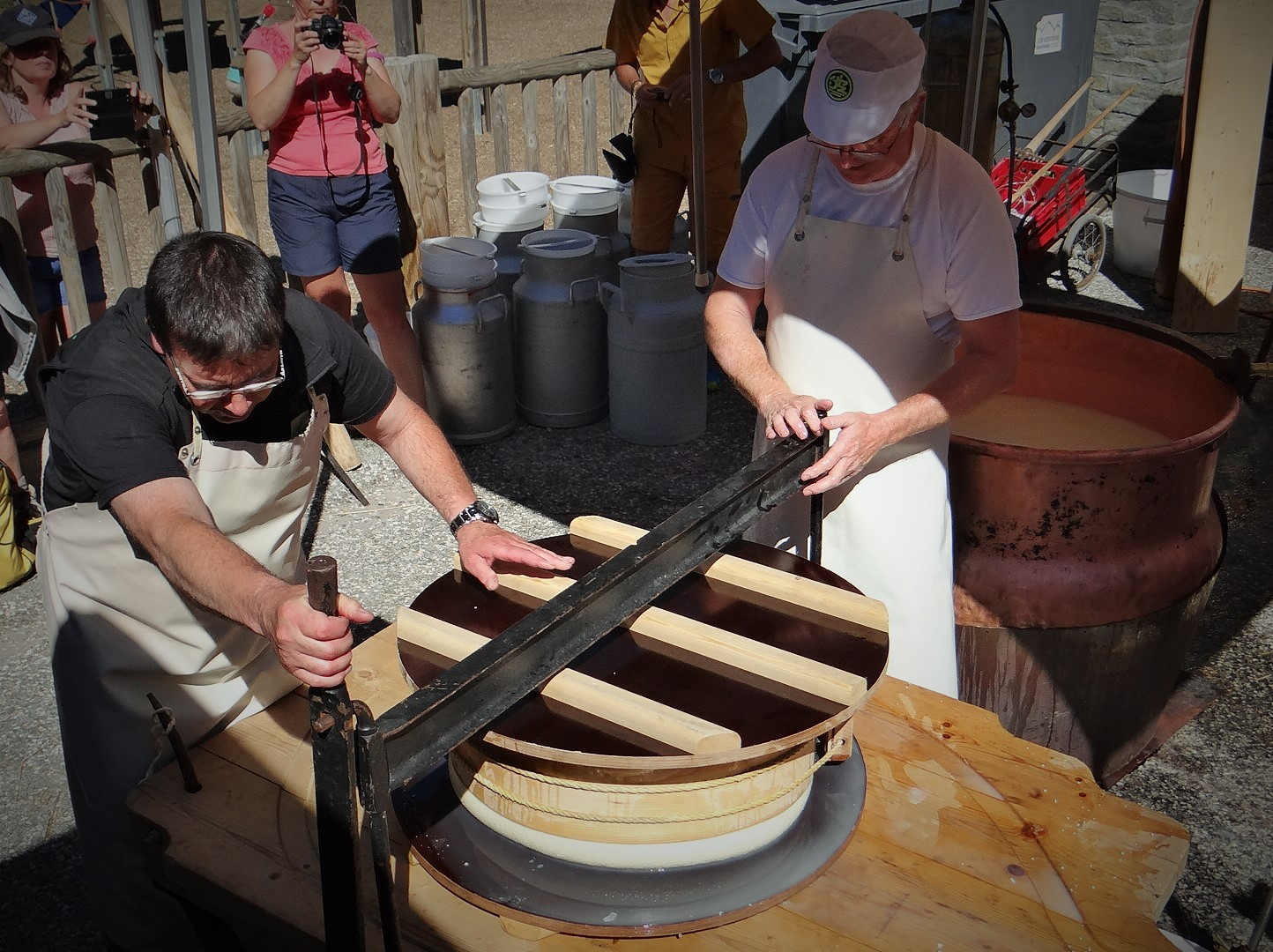
Pressing to expel more moisture

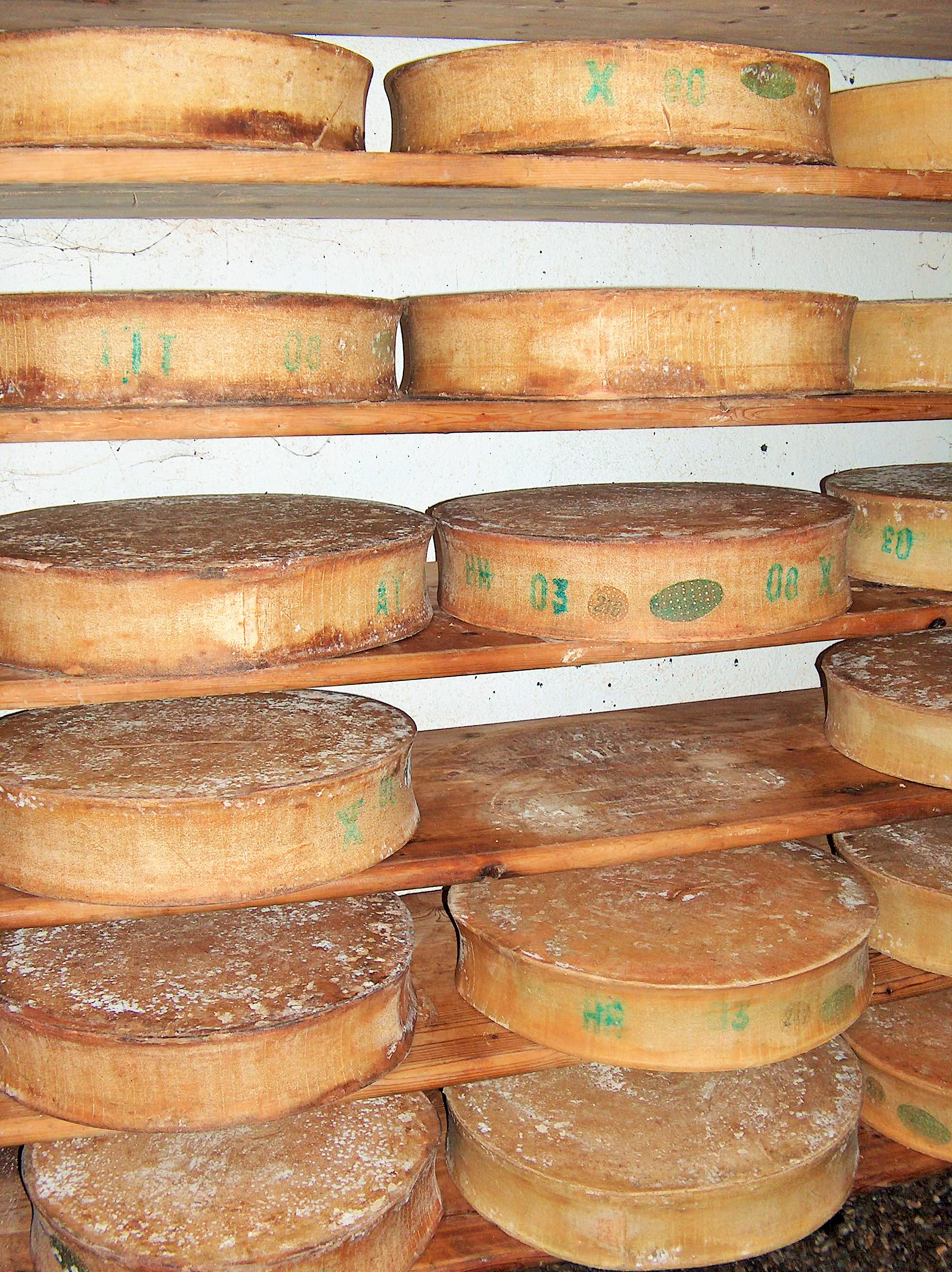
Maturing Beaufort cheeses

== See also ==
- Ziger/Sérac, a by-product of Swiss-type cheese making
