= Appenzeller cheese =

Swiss medium-hard Alpine cheese

Appenzeller
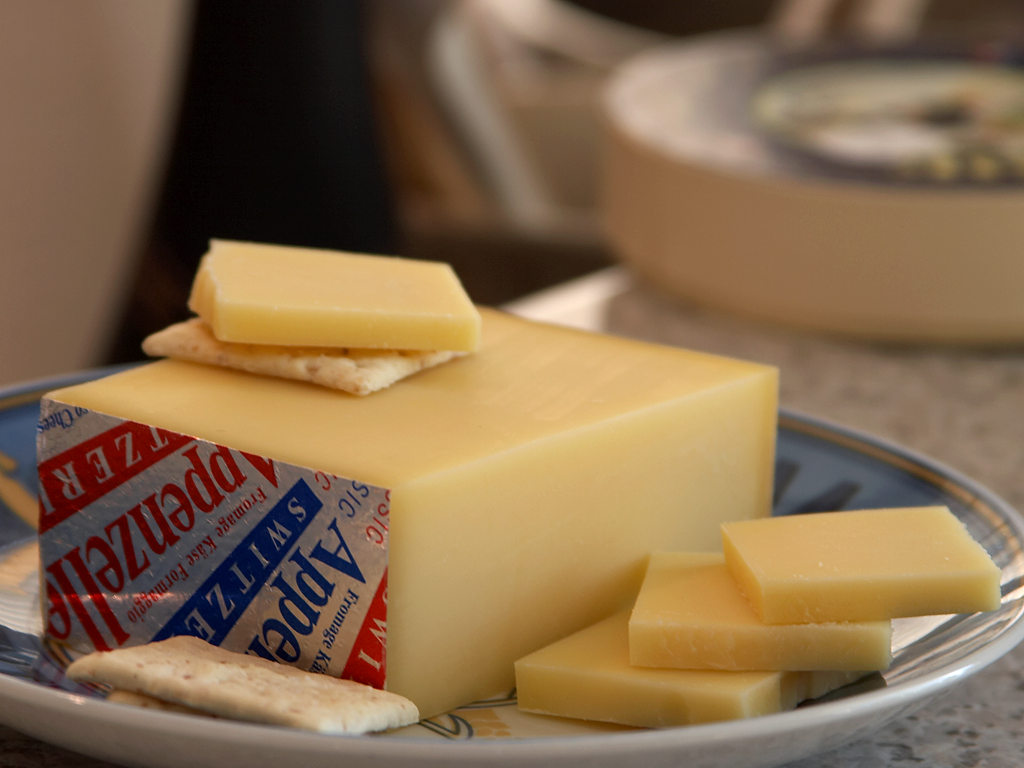
- Country of origin: Switzerland
- Region: Appenzell
- Source of milk: thermized cows' milk
- Pasteurized: No
- Texture: Hard
- Aging time: 3 months or more

Appenzeller cheese (German pronunciation: [ˈapn̩ˌt͡sɛlɐ]) is a hard cow's-milk washed-rind cheese produced in the Appenzellerland region of northeast Switzerland, in the two modern-day cantons of Appenzell Innerrhoden and Appenzell Ausserrhoden. It is classified as a Swiss-type or Alpine cheese.

== History ==
Cheese from Appenzellerland has a documented history of at least 700 years, being first mentioned in a document from 1282. However, the manufacturing process is not mentioned and may have been different from currently.

About 75 dairies produce Appenzeller, each with a different recipe for their brine wash. Most of the recipes are trade secrets.

== Production ==
A herbal brine, sometimes incorporating wine or cider, is applied to the wheels of cheese while they cure, which flavors and preserves the cheese while promoting the formation of a rind.

== Variants ==
The cheese is straw-colored, with tiny holes and a golden rind. It has a strong smell and a nutty or fruity flavour, which can range from mild to tangy, depending on how long it is aged. Three types are sold:

- "Classic". Aged three to four months, mild. The wheels are wrapped in a silver label.
- "Surchoix". Aged four to six months, sharp. Gold label.
- "Extra". Aged six months or longer, extra sharp. Black label.

== See also ==
- List of cheeses
