= Thermization =

Method of sanitizing raw milk with low heat

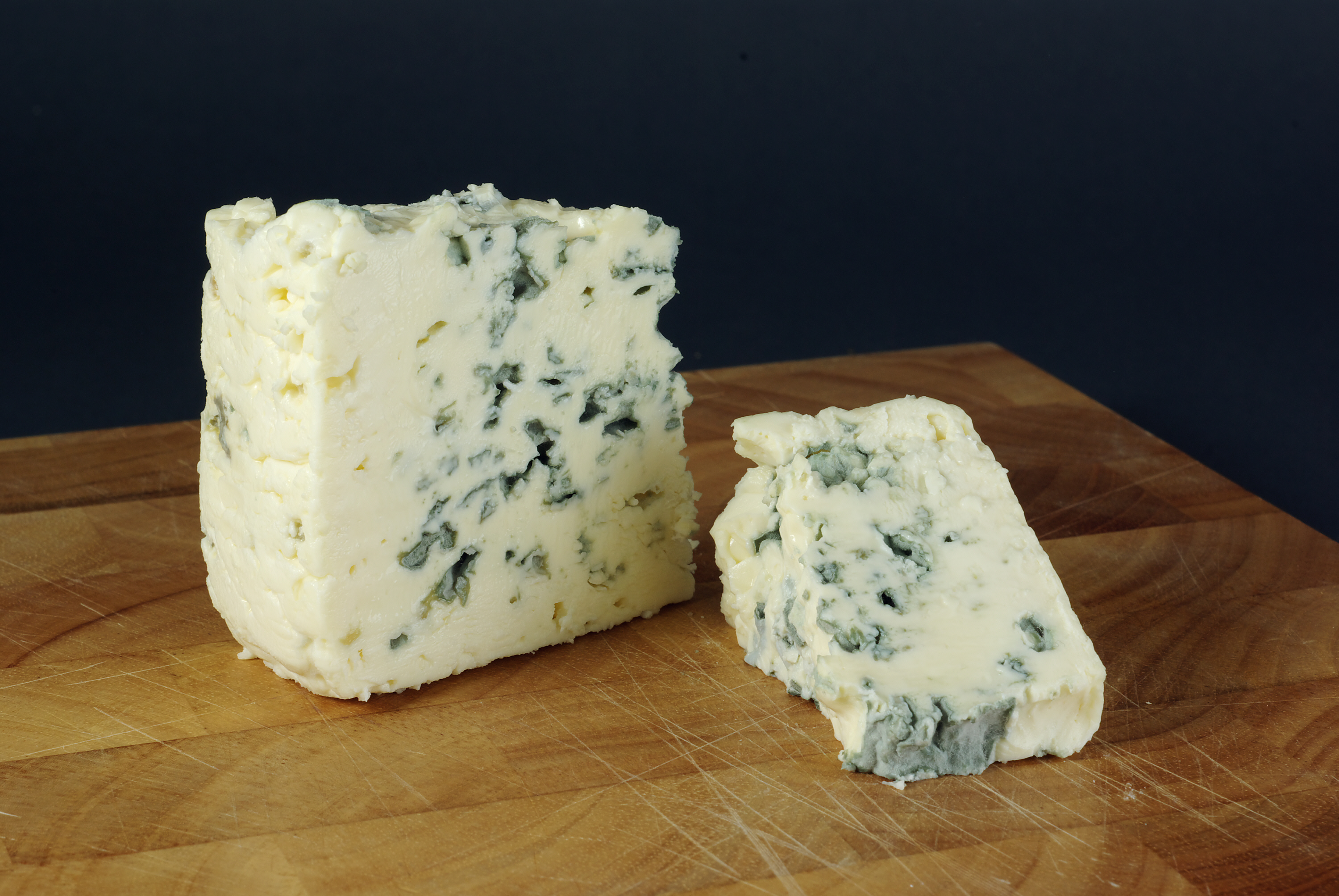
Some cheeses, including varieties of blue cheese, are made from thermized milk.

Thermization, also spelled thermisation, is a method of sanitizing raw milk with low heat. "Thermization is a generic description of a range of subpasteurization heat treatments (57 to 68°C × 10 to 20 s) that markedly reduce the number of spoilage bacteria in milk with minimal heat damage." The process is not used on other food products, and is similar to pasteurization but uses lower temperatures, allowing the milk product to retain more of its original taste. In Europe, there is a distinction between cheeses made of thermized milk and raw-milk cheeses. However, the United States' Food and Drug Administration (FDA) places the same regulations on all unpasteurized cheeses. As a result, cheeses from thermized milk must be aged for 60 days or more before being sold in the United States, the same restriction placed on raw-milk cheeses by the FDA.

Thermization involves heating milk at temperatures of around 145–149 °F (63–65 °C) for 15 seconds, while pasteurization involves heating milk at 160 °F (71 °C) for 15 seconds or at 145 °F (63 °C) for 30 minutes. Thermization is used to extend the keeping quality of raw milk (the length of time that milk is suitable for consumption) when it cannot be immediately used in other products, such as cheese. Thermization can also be used to extend the storage life of fermented milk products by inactivating microorganisms in the product.

Thermization inactivates psychrotrophic bacteria in milk and allows the milk to be stored below 8 °C (46 °F) for three days, or stored at 0–1 °C (32–34 °F) for seven days. Later, the milk may be given stronger heat treatment to be preserved longer. Cooling thermized milk before reheating is necessary to delay/prevent the outgrowth of bacterial spores. When the milk is first heated, spores can begin to germinate, but their growth can be halted or delayed when the milk is refrigerated, depending on the microorganisms' growth requirements. Germinated spores are sensitive to subsequent heating, however since germination is not a homogeneous process, not all spores will germinate or be inactivated by subsequent heating.
