= Chafing =

Chafing can refer to:

- Chafing (nautical), damage to sails or other parts of a boat from rubbing
- Chafing (skin), skin irritation from rubbing or sweat

== See also ==
- Chafing dish
- Chafing fuel
