= Food warmer =

Appliance for keeping food warm

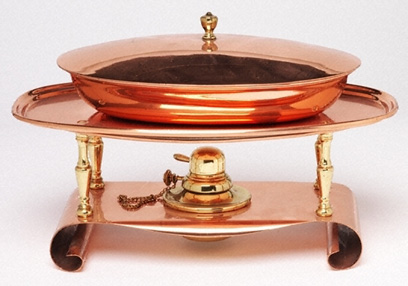
A chafing dish, one of many kinds of food warmers

A food warmer is typically a table-top device used to maintain the serving temperature of prepared food. It is used both in homes and restaurants.

== Home use ==
When used domestically, such as with fondue, a food warmer may simply be a small vessel containing food upon a trivet which contains a heat source such as a flame or electric element.

Some food cookers can then, in essence, become food warmers as they use a reduced heat to maintain a serving temperature. Electric rice cookers do this automatically. A multicooker is an electric kitchen appliance for automated cooking using a timer. In addition to cooking programs, a multicooker may have functions to keep food warm.

Some electric-powered personal-sized food coolers have a setting that serves to warm food inside of the cooler. These are typically marketed as cooler/warmers.

== Commercial use ==
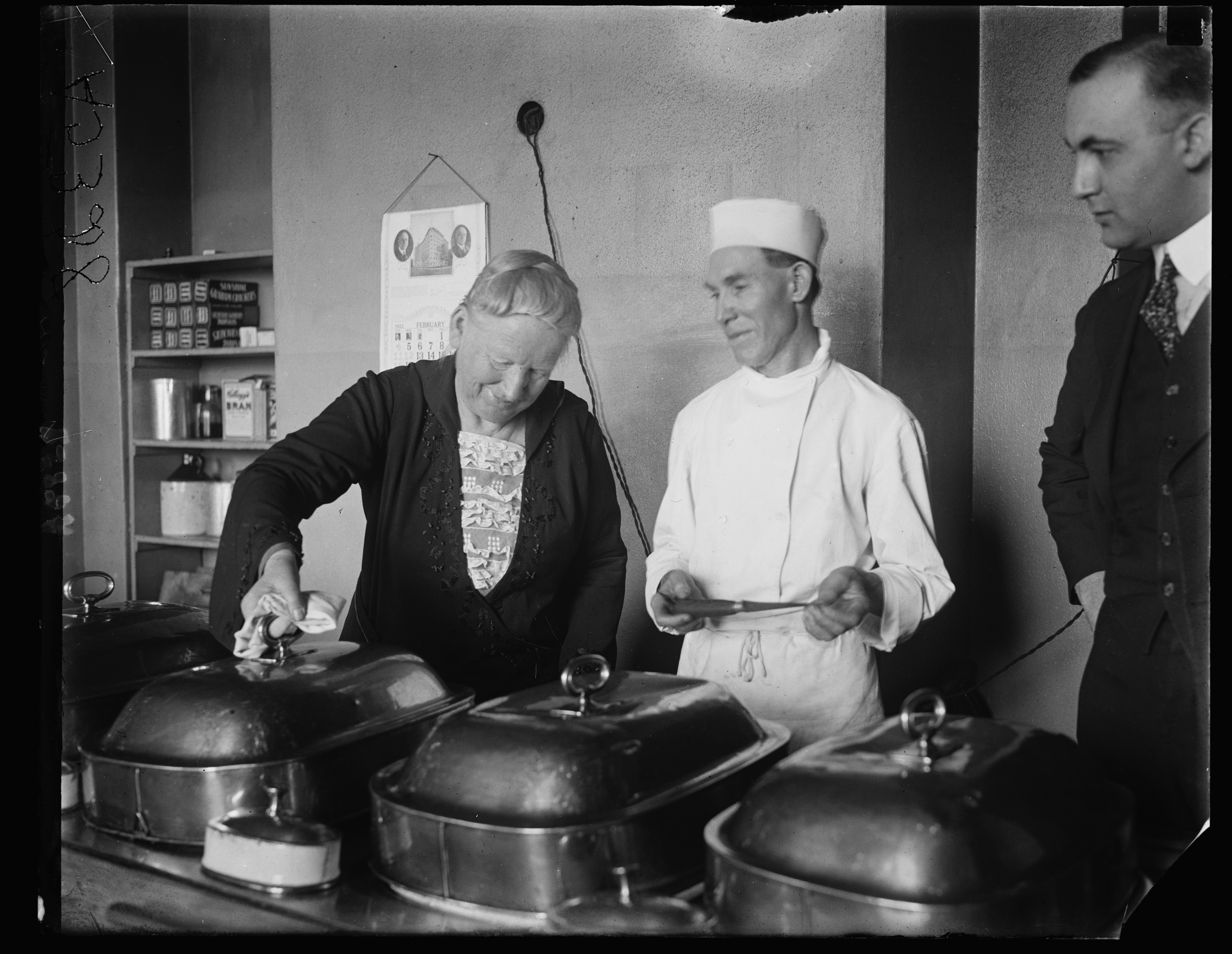
A steam table

Commercial food warmers are used in restaurants as well as outdoor food carts.

In restaurants and hotels they may operate the same way, but on a larger scale. Buffets commonly use large, stainless steel containers with a sterno fuel source. Restaurants also use steam tables to keep multiple vessels warm at once. These have a large, shallow body of water that is kept at a certain temperature with pans of food placed on top, typically rectangle stainless steel. East Asia in particular uses steam tables in restaurants, and notably, portable ones to keep bamboo steamers containing dim sum dishes hot.

A flameless ration heater is a flameless chemical heater used to heat some types of Meal, Ready-to-Eat entrees.

== List of food warmers ==
This is a list of food warmers. Some may also serve as cookers.

- Bain-marie
- Chafing dish
- Crock pot
- Fondue
- Multicooker – some have a warming setting
- Rice cooker
- Steam table

== Gallery ==
Food warmers

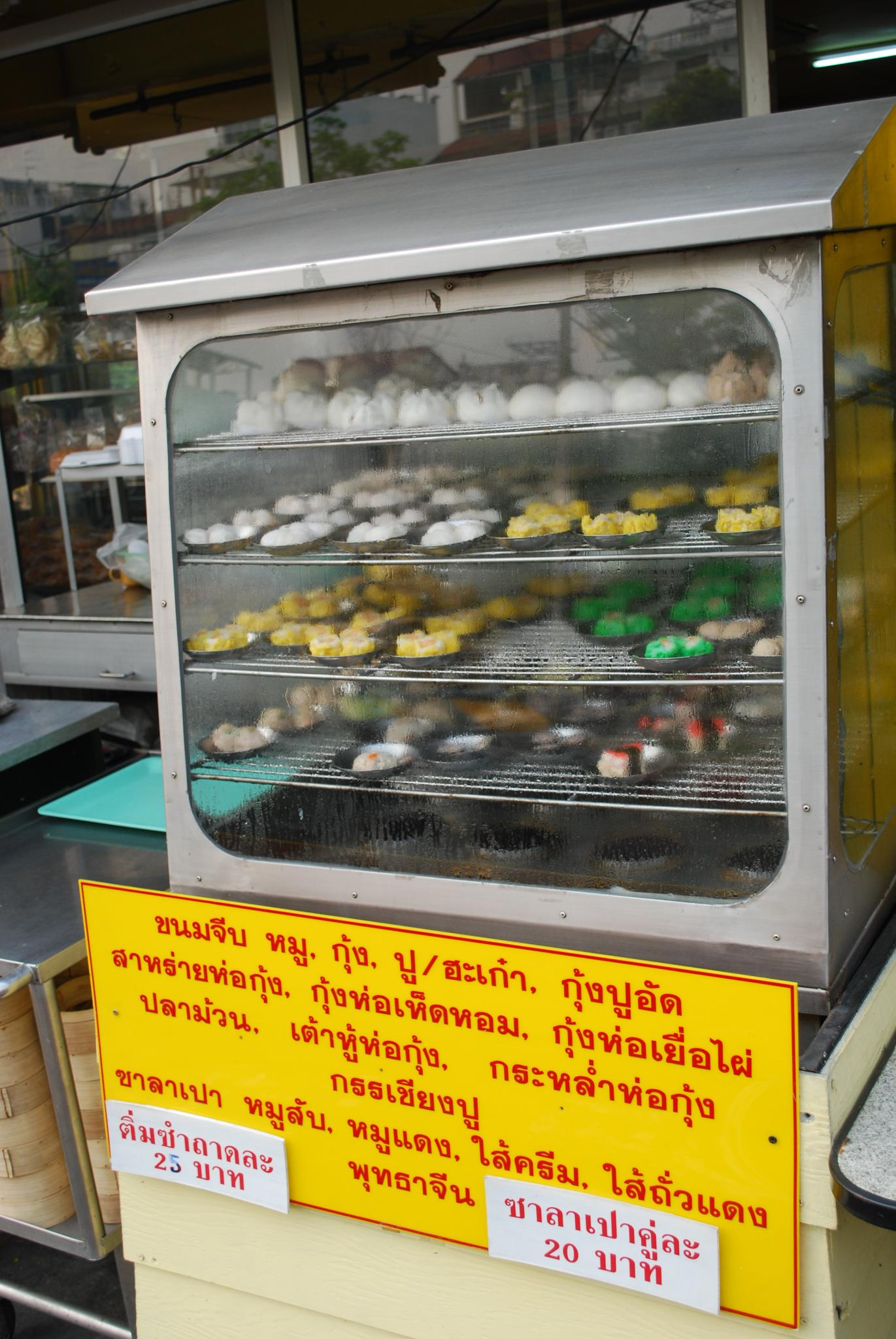
A commercial food warmer

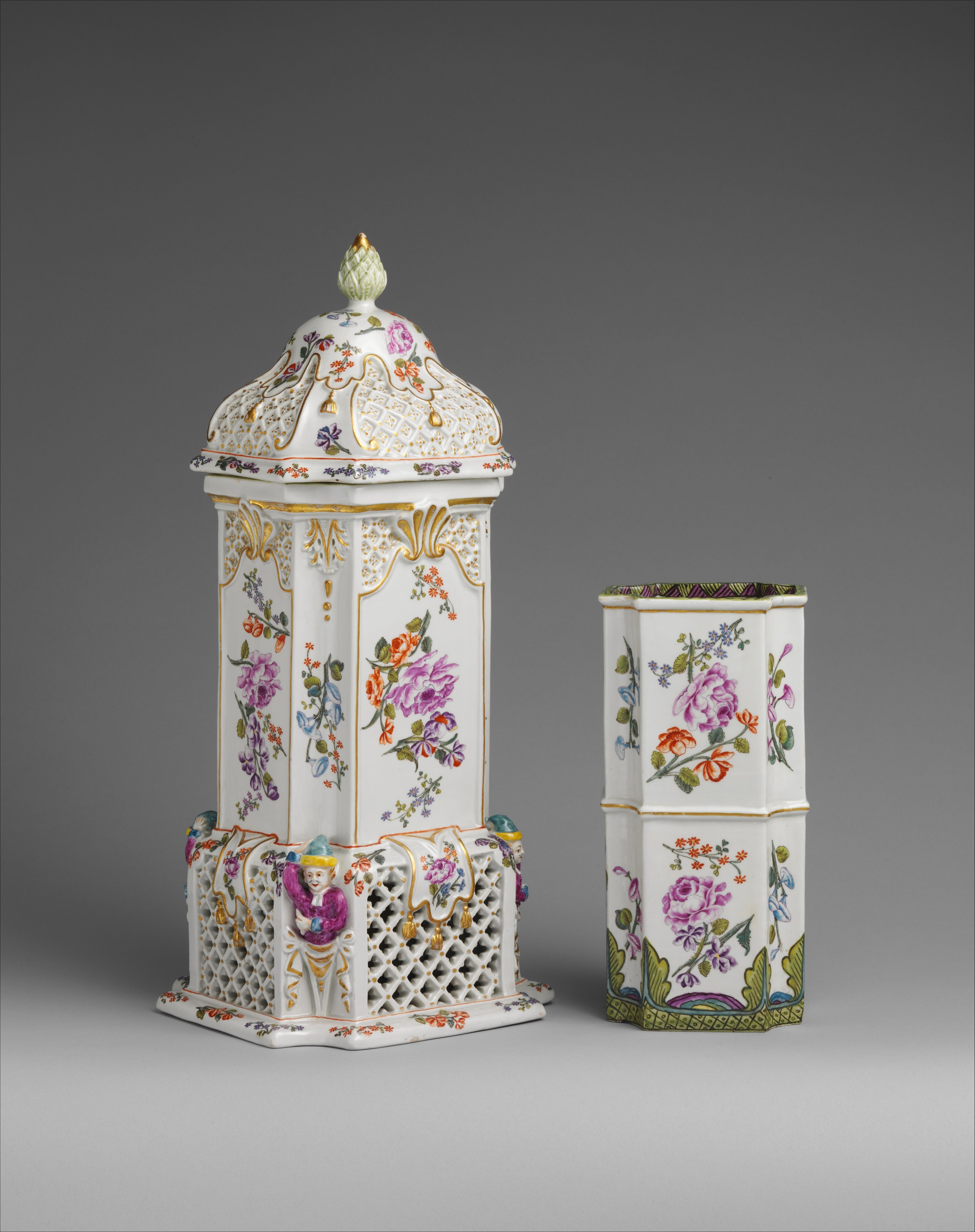
An Austrian food warmer with insert, circa 1730-1735

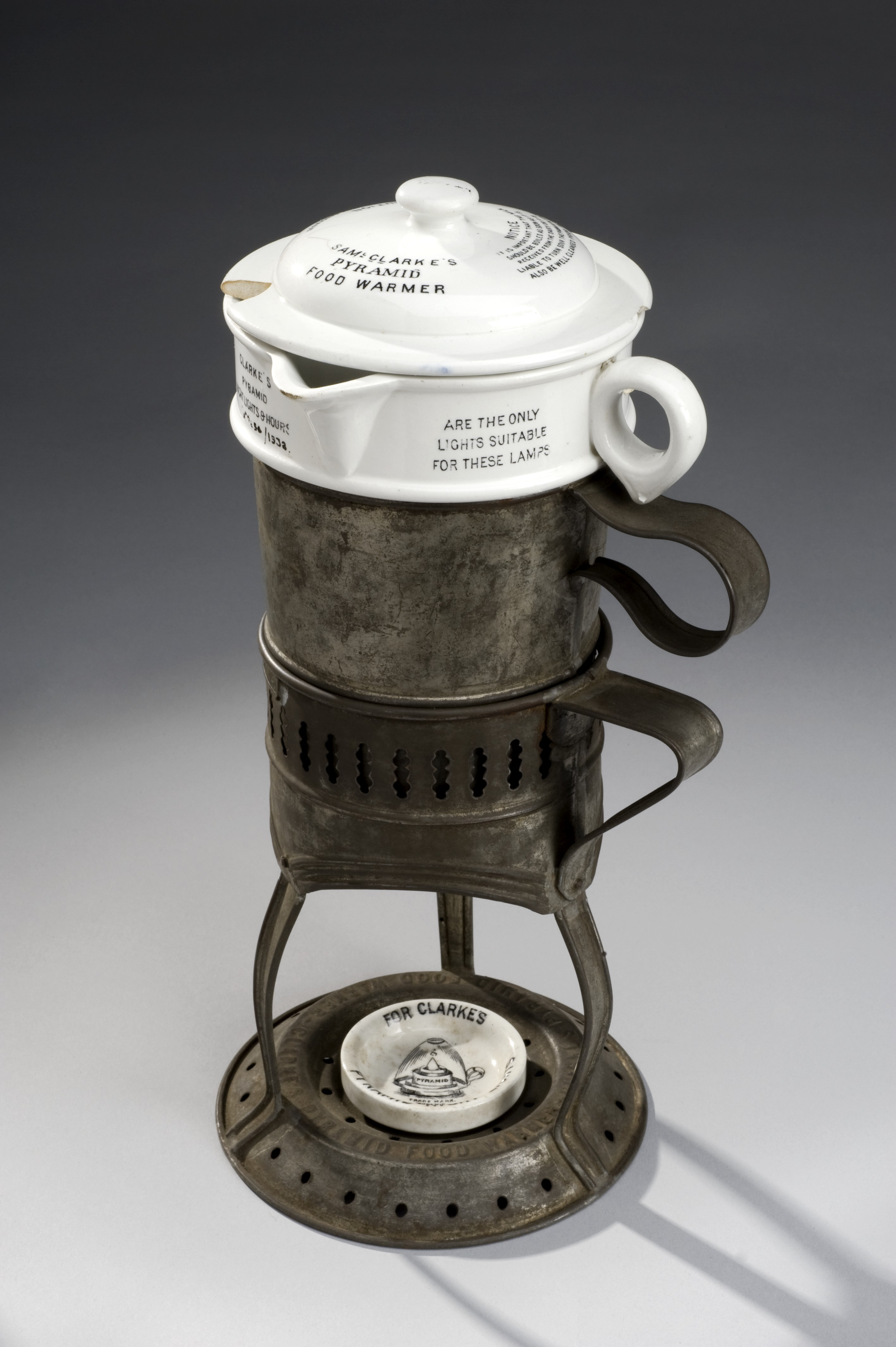
A 'Pyramid' food warmer invented by Samuel Clarke in England

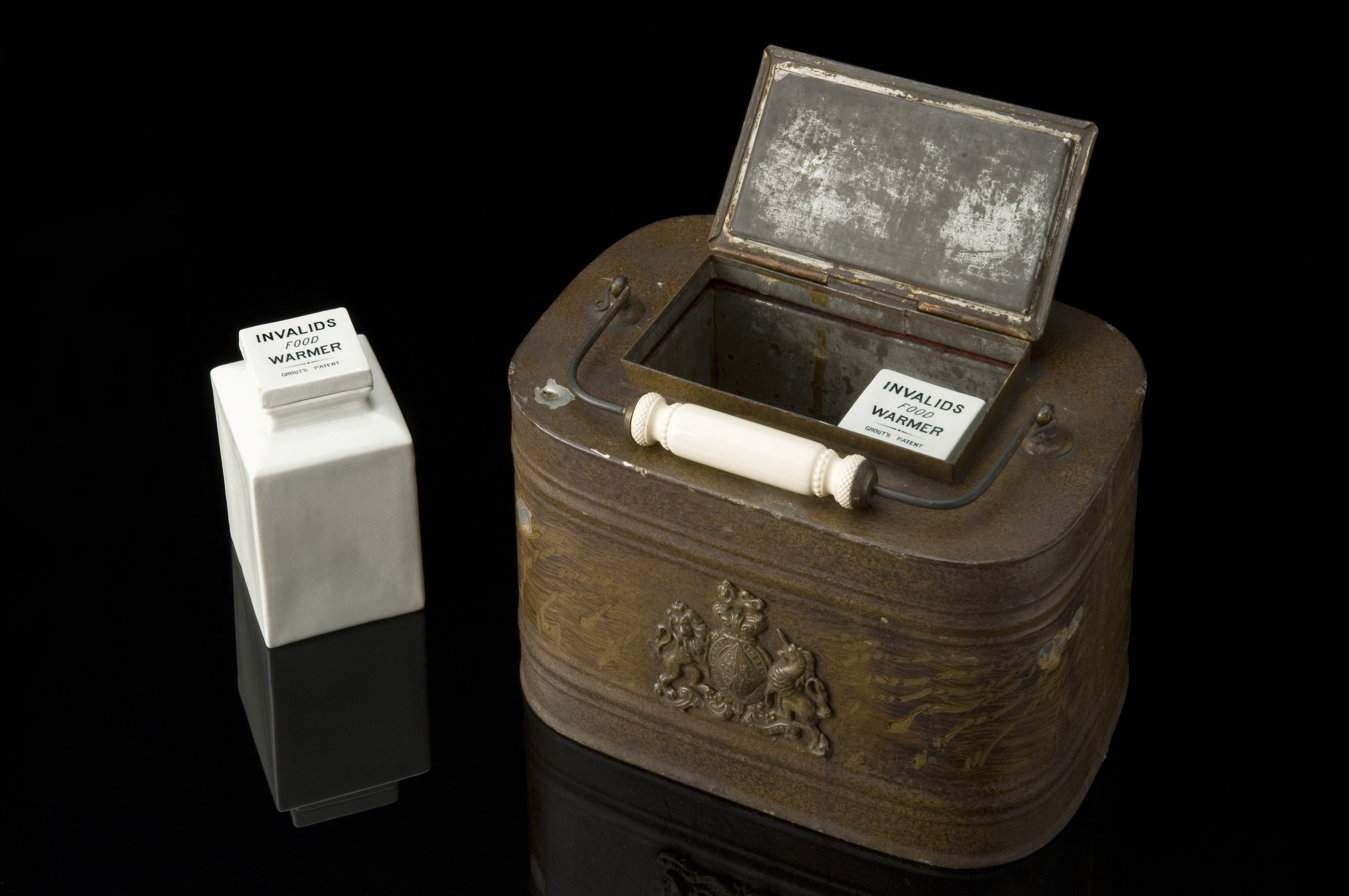
Grout's patent invalid's food warmer, England, 1871-1900

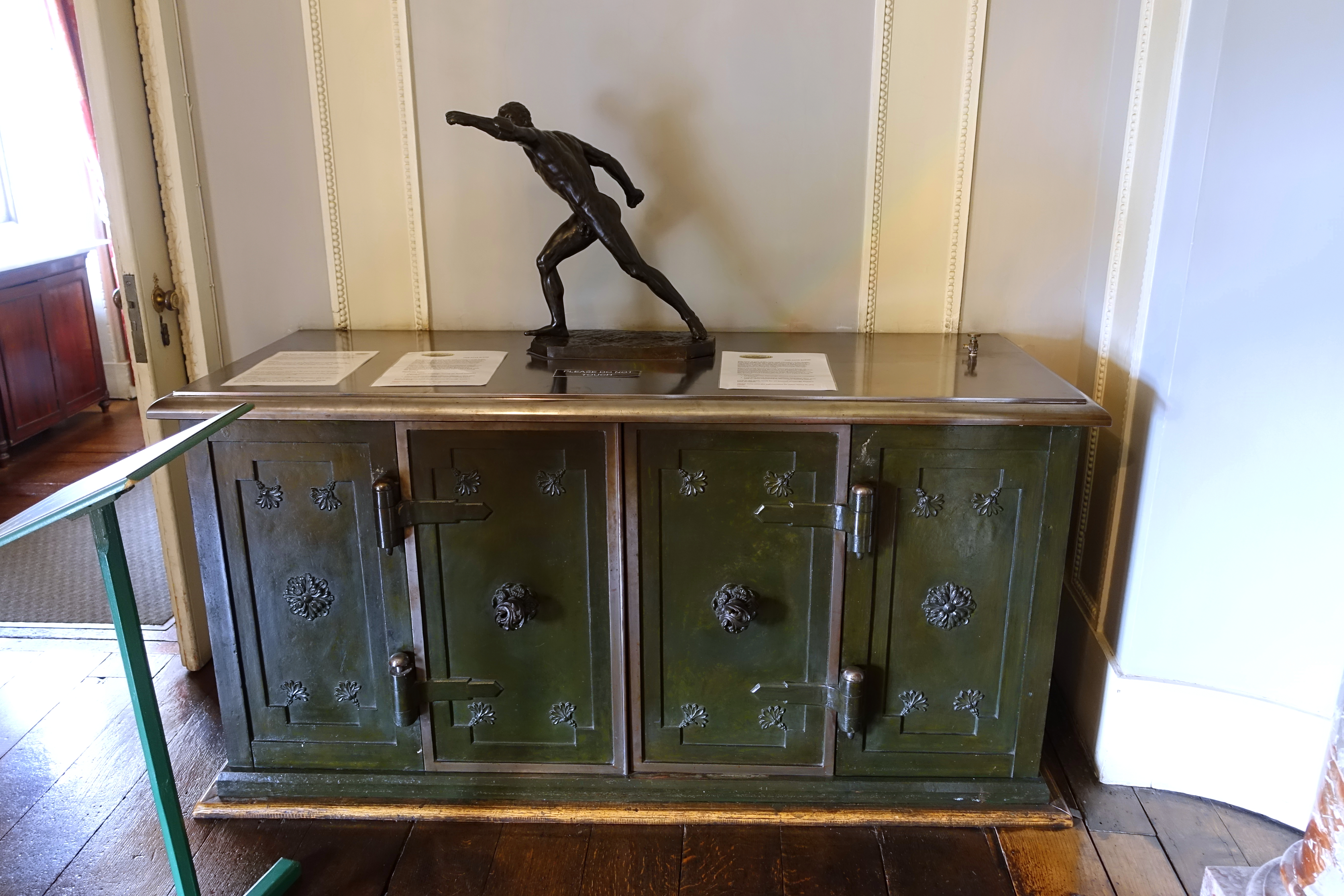
A food warming cabinet, c. 1910, cast iron, Ante Room, Shugborough Hall, Staffordshire, England

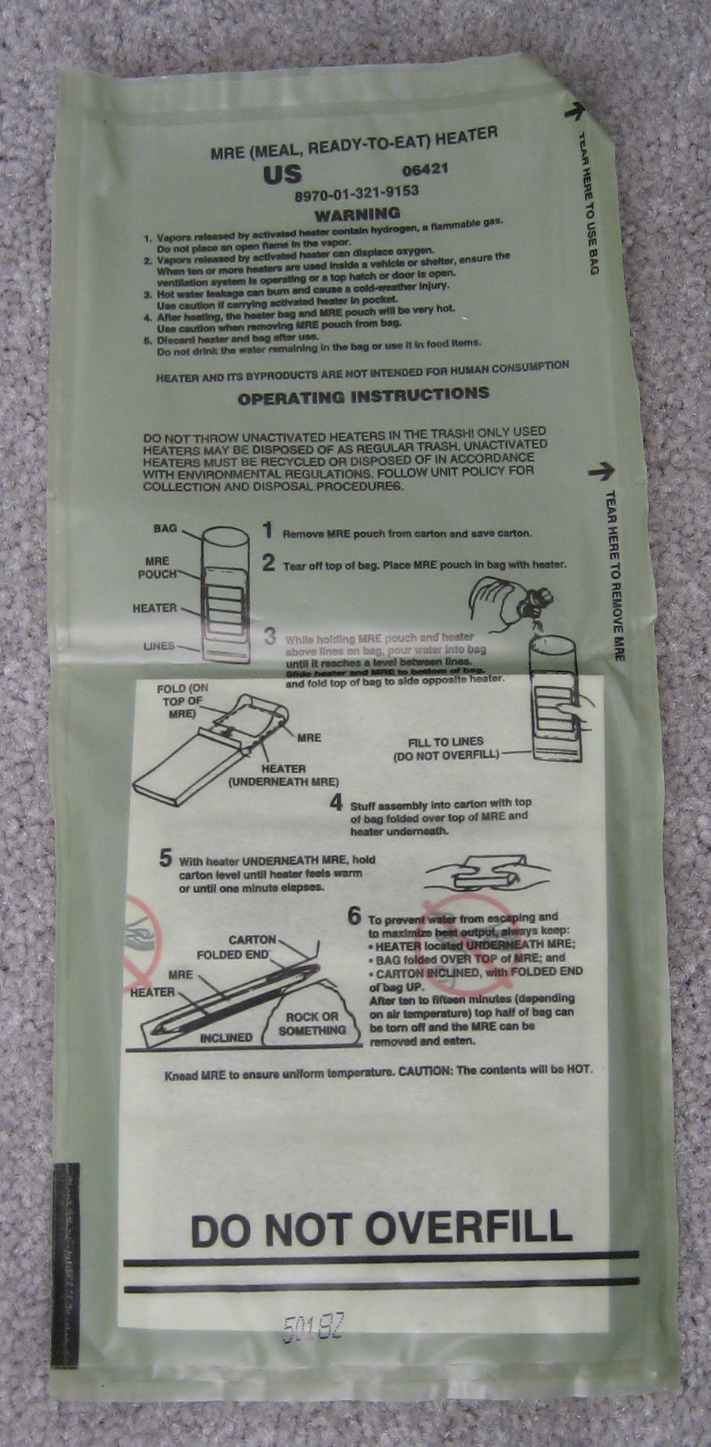
A flameless ration heater used for Meal, Ready-to-Eat

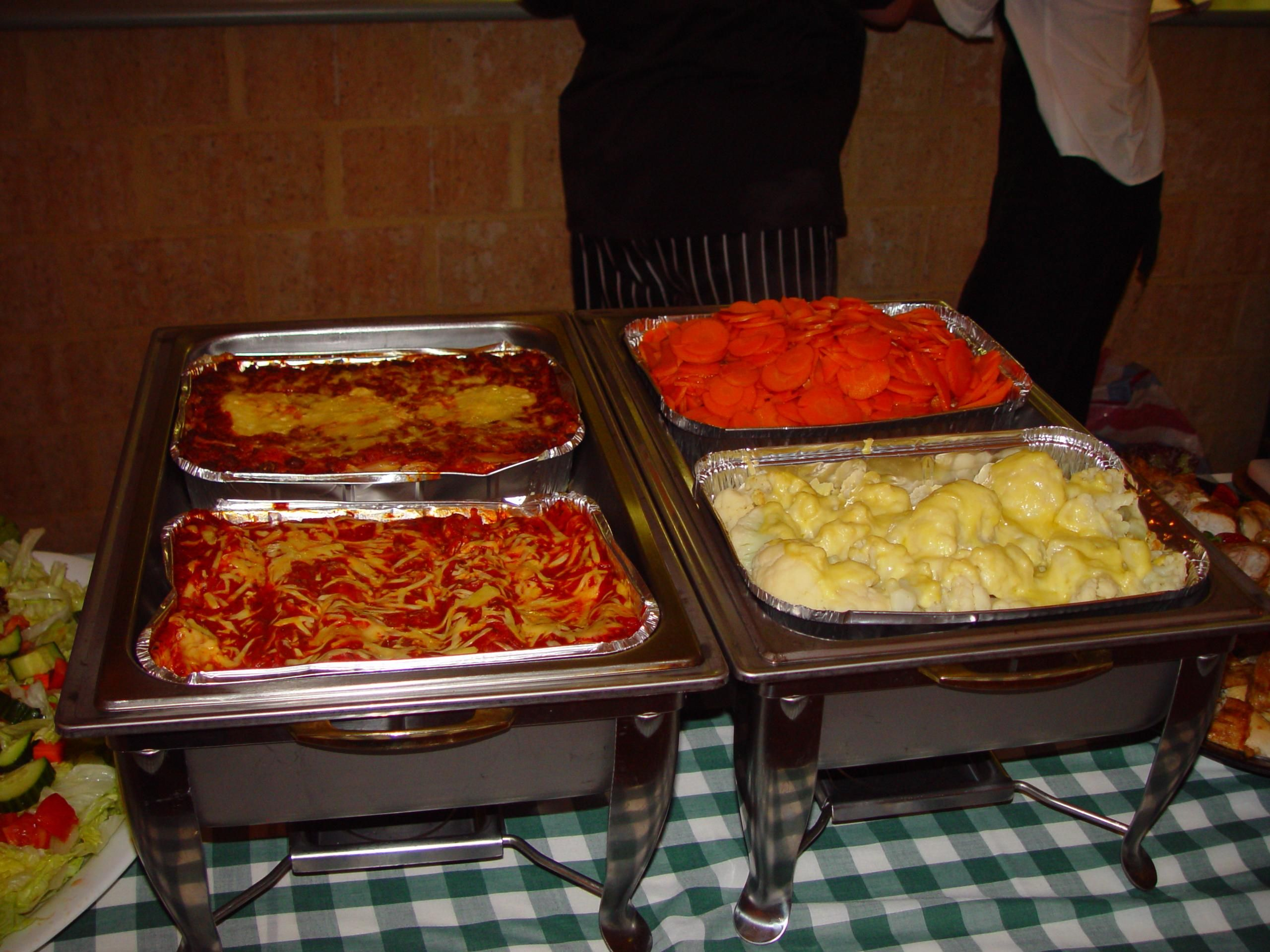
A contemporary food warmer with various foods

== See also ==
- Buffet
- Catering
