= Gyaho =

Tibetan cuisine - dish eaten by Monks

- Course: Main
- Place of origin: Tibet
- Main ingredients: Vermicelli; Kombu; Mushrooms; Meatballs; Bamboo sprouts

In Tibetan cuisine, gyaho is a chafing dish in the Han Chinese style: a hot pot of vermicelli, kombu, mushrooms, meatballs, bamboo sprouts and salt. It has special significance, generally eaten by senior monks during important ceremonies.

== See also ==
- List of Tibetan dishes
