= Vacherin Fribourgeois =

Semi-hard cheese from Switzerland

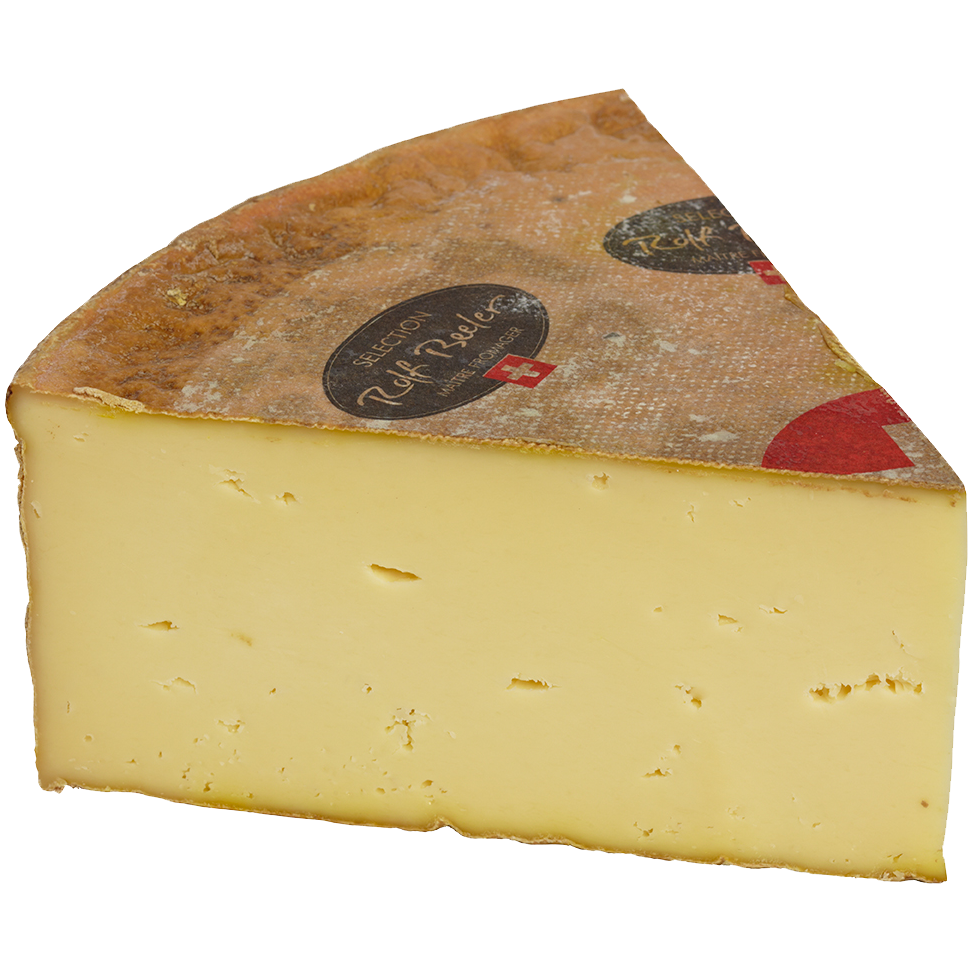
Vacherin Fribourgeois

Vacherin Fribourgeois (French pronunciation: [vaʃʁɛ̃ fʁibuʁʒwa], Vacherin of Fribourg) a Swiss semi-hard cheese made from thermised milk. It is produced under Swiss AOP in the canton of Fribourg, where Gruyère also originates. It has a slightly acidic, resiny flavor, akin to Italian Fontina, with a varying strength depending on the age and type. It is also a basic component lending character to fondues (depending on the recipe). Vacherin Fribourgeois has Swiss AOC status with 6 varieties being available:

- Classic (aged: 6–12 weeks)
- Extra (aged: minimum 12 weeks)
- Rustic (aged: minimum 12 weeks, but up to 25 weeks (6 months))
- Alpage (aged: 12–25 weeks)
- Mountain (aged 9–25 weeks)
- Bio (Organic) (aged: minimum 9 weeks)

The older the vacherin gets, the stronger the smell of ammonia due to microorganism activity in the cheese. Vacherin d'alpage (Alpine Vacherin) is made from the milk of cows pasturing in alpine meadows and hence has a much richer taste.

== See also ==
- List of cheeses
- List of Swiss cheeses
- Culinary Heritage of Switzerland
