= Chocolate fountain =

Device for serving chocolate fondue

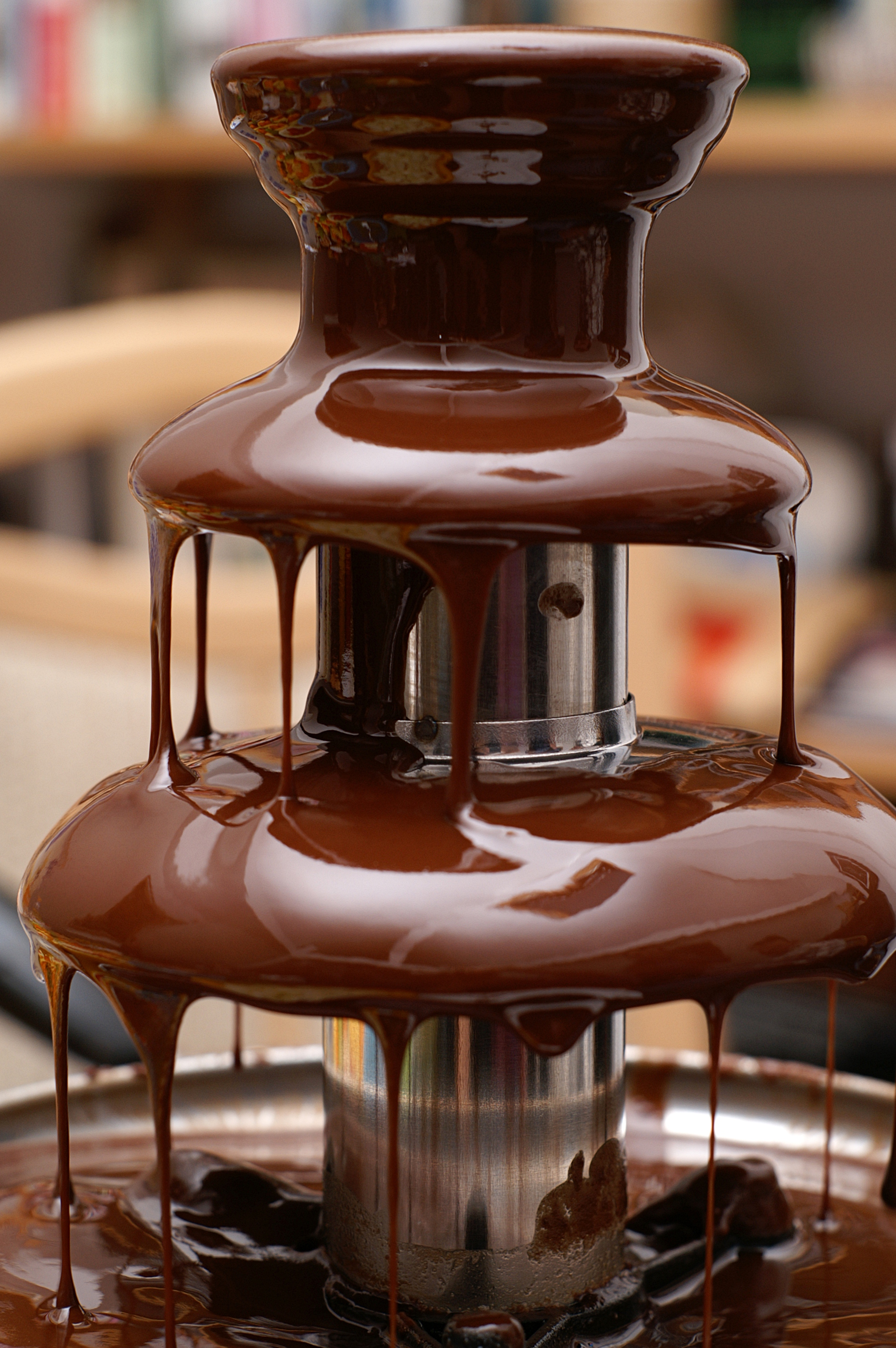

Chocolate fountain in use at a buffet in Japan, 2016

A chocolate fountain is a device for serving chocolate fondue. Typical examples resemble a stepped cone, standing 2–4 feet (0.61–1.22 m) tall with a crown at the top and stacked tiers over a basin at the bottom. The basin is heated to keep the chocolate in a warm liquid state so it can be pulled into a center cylinder then vertically transported to the top of the fountain by an Archimedes screw. From there it flows over the tiers creating a chocolate "waterfall" in which food items typically like marshmallows, cookies, strawberries or other fruits can be dipped by using a skewers.

The Wenschitz Confiserie in Allhaming, Austria was the world's tallest chocolate fountain, being 12.27 metres (40.3 ft) tall.

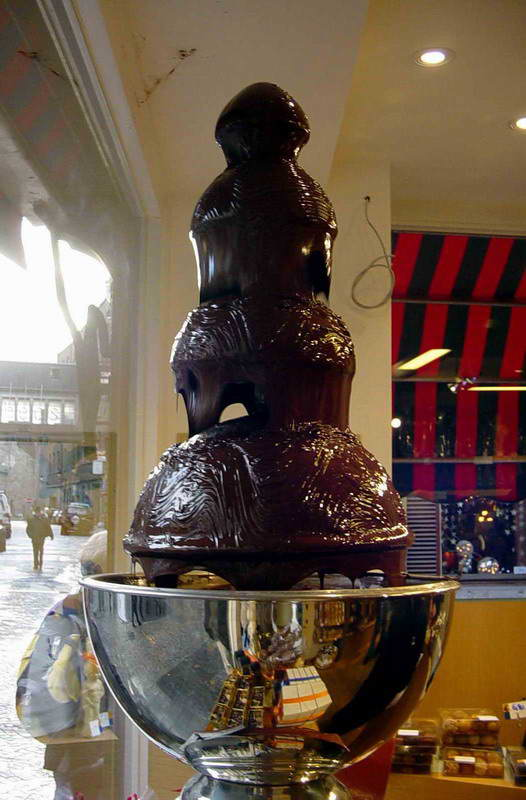
A commercial chocolate fountain in a shop in Brussels, Belgium

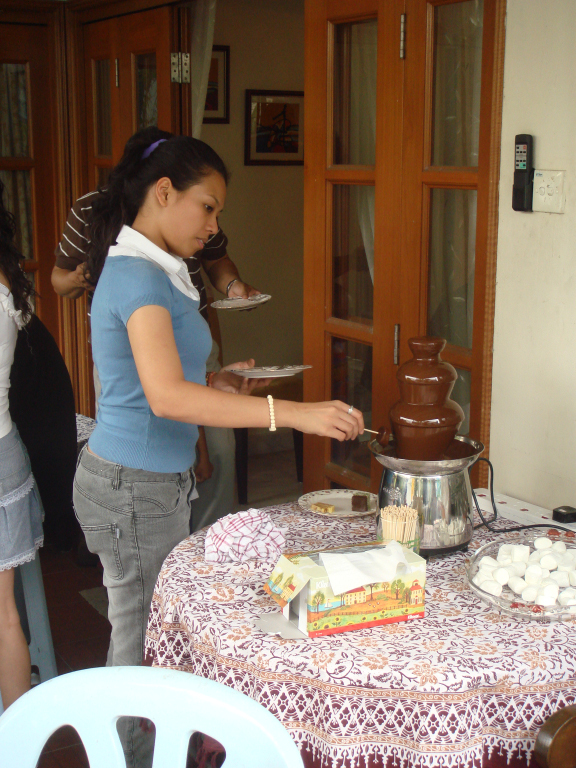
Home chocolate fountain

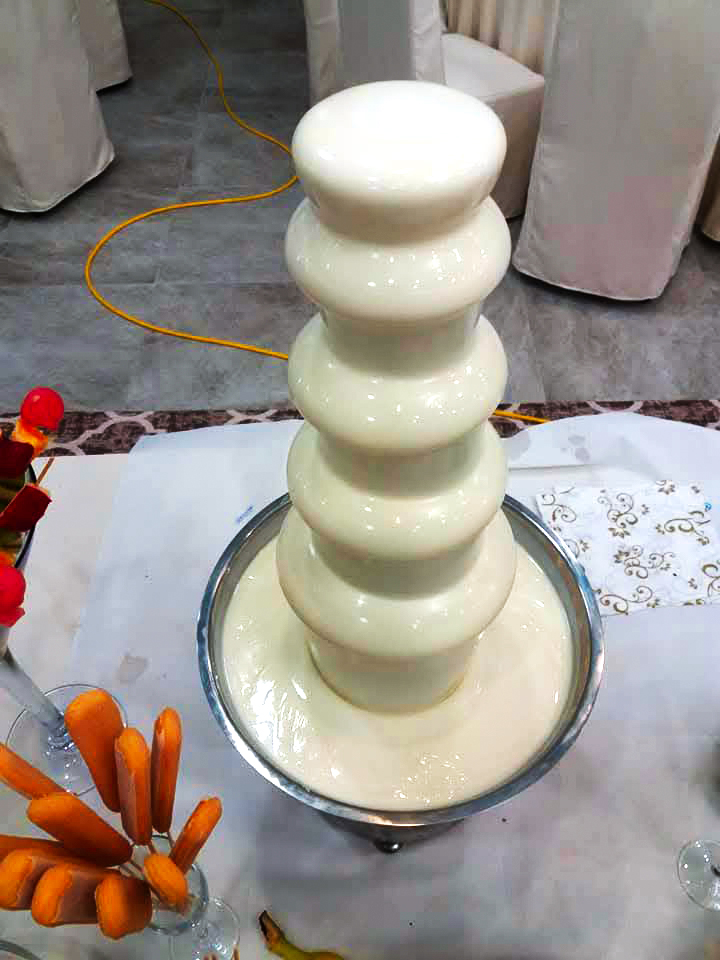
White chocolate fountain

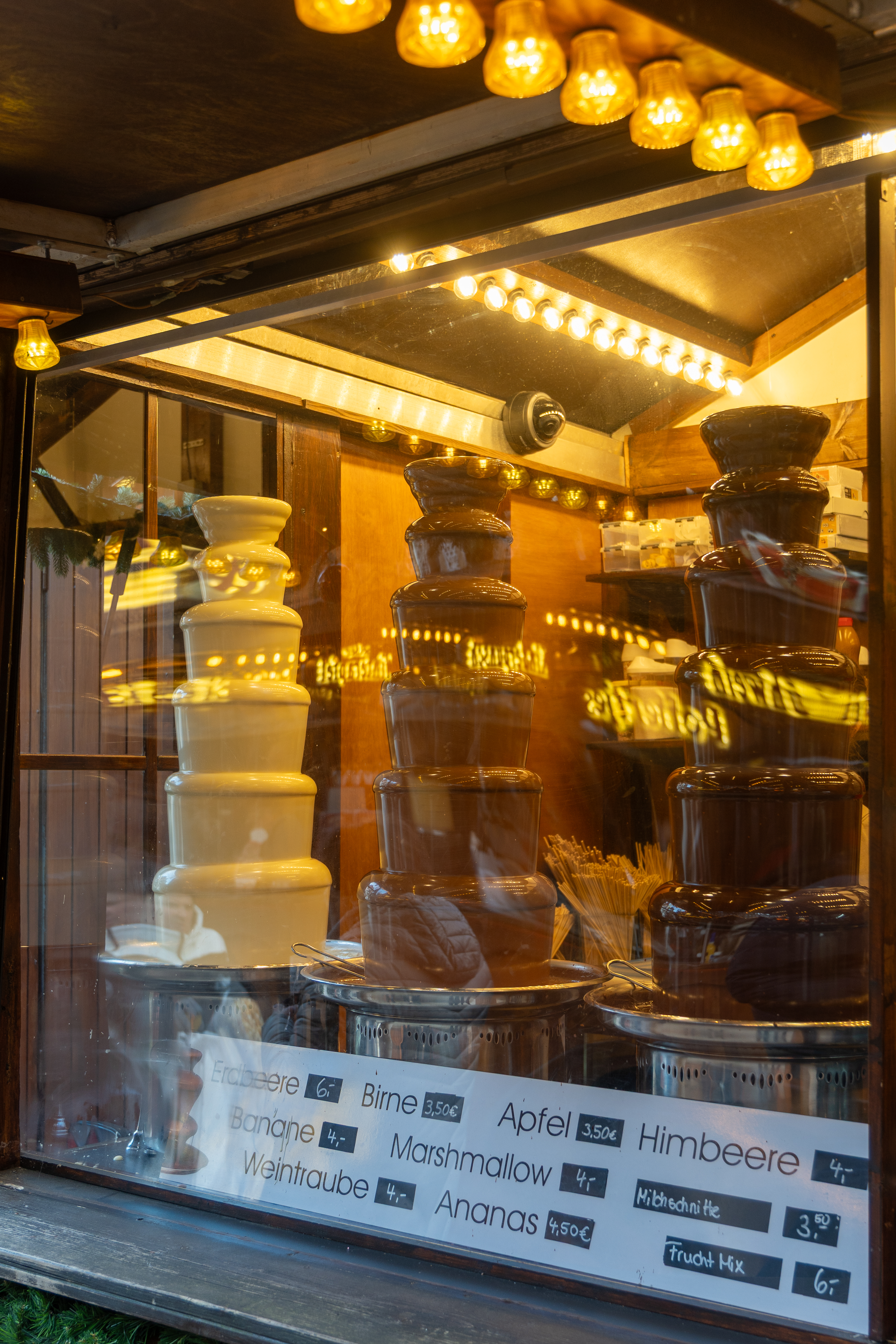
Dark, milk and white chocolate fountains in Weihnachtsmarkt, Osnabrück, Germany

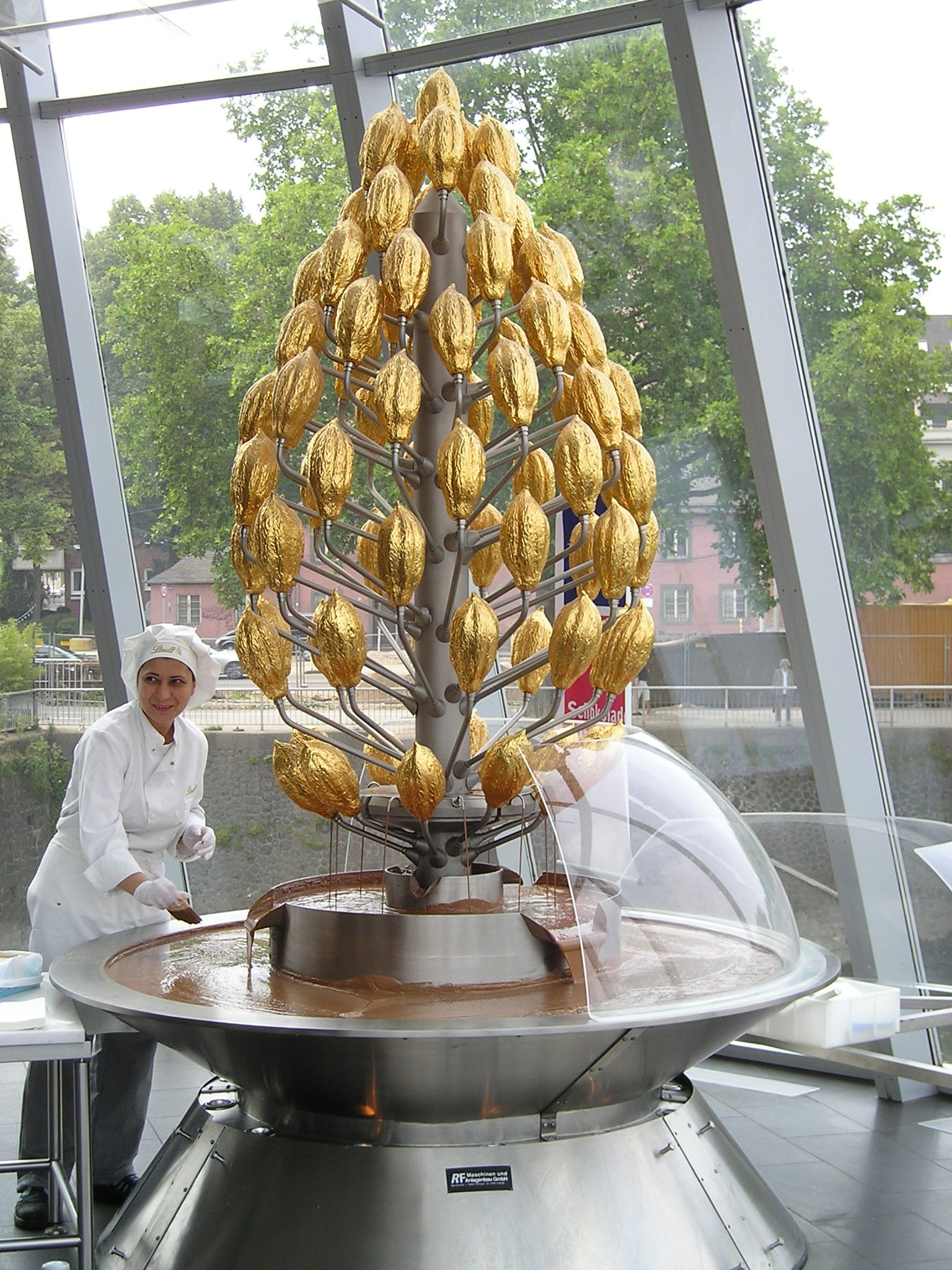
Chocolate tree fountain in the Imhoff chocolate museum in Cologne, Germany

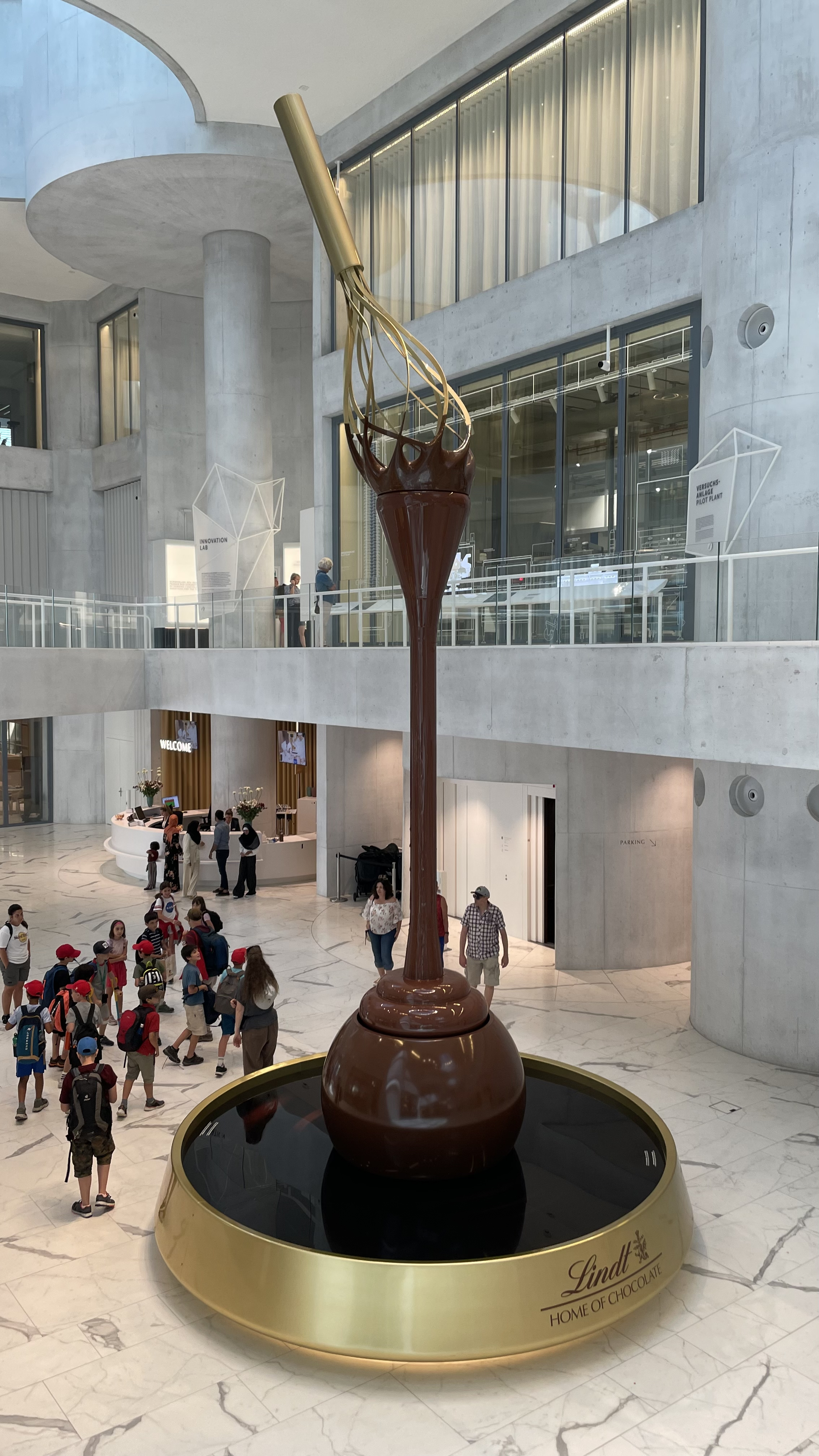
Large chocolate fountain in Lindt Home of Chocolate in Zurich, Switzerland
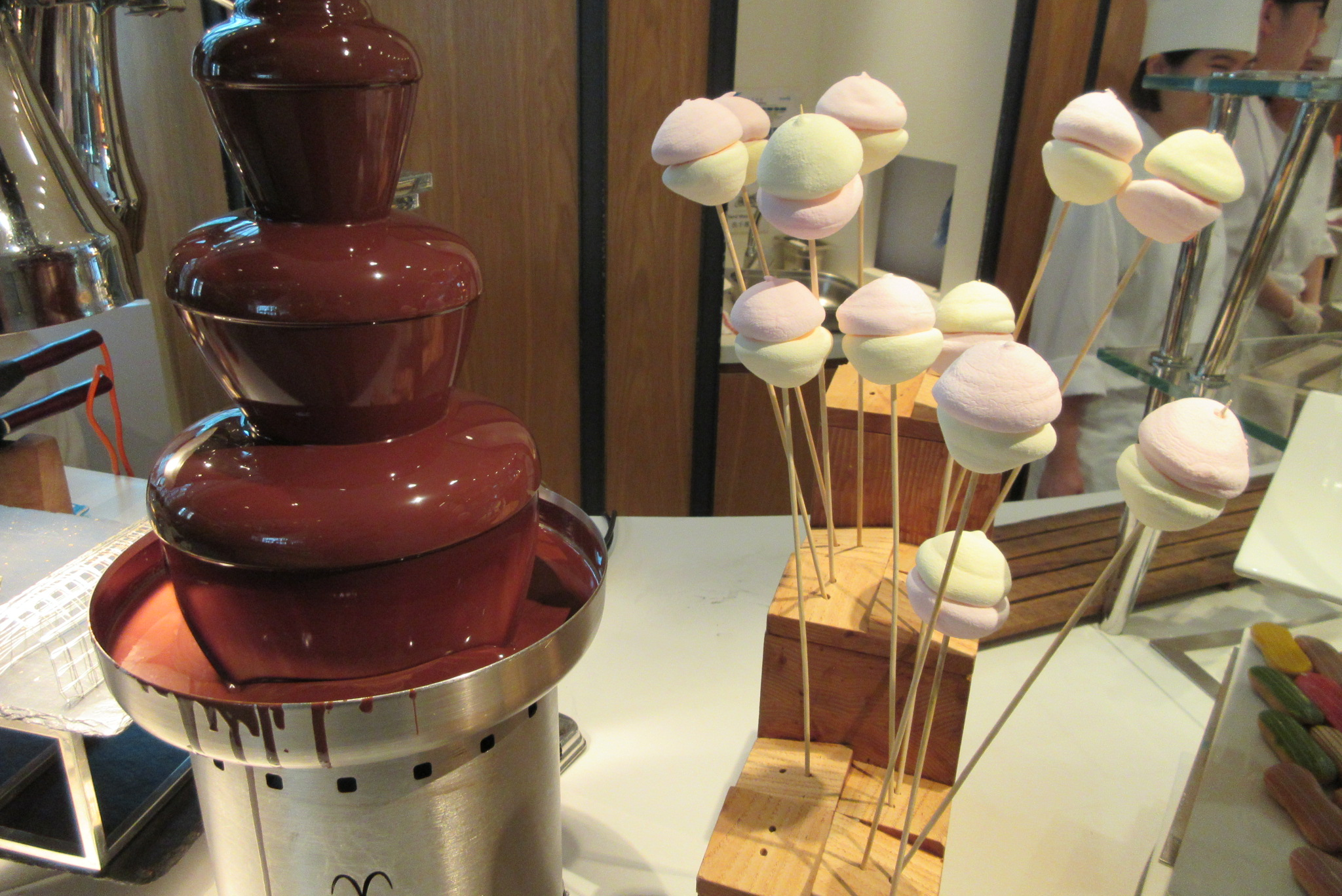
Chocolate fontain with marshmallows for dipping in Cordis Hotel buffet in Hong Kong

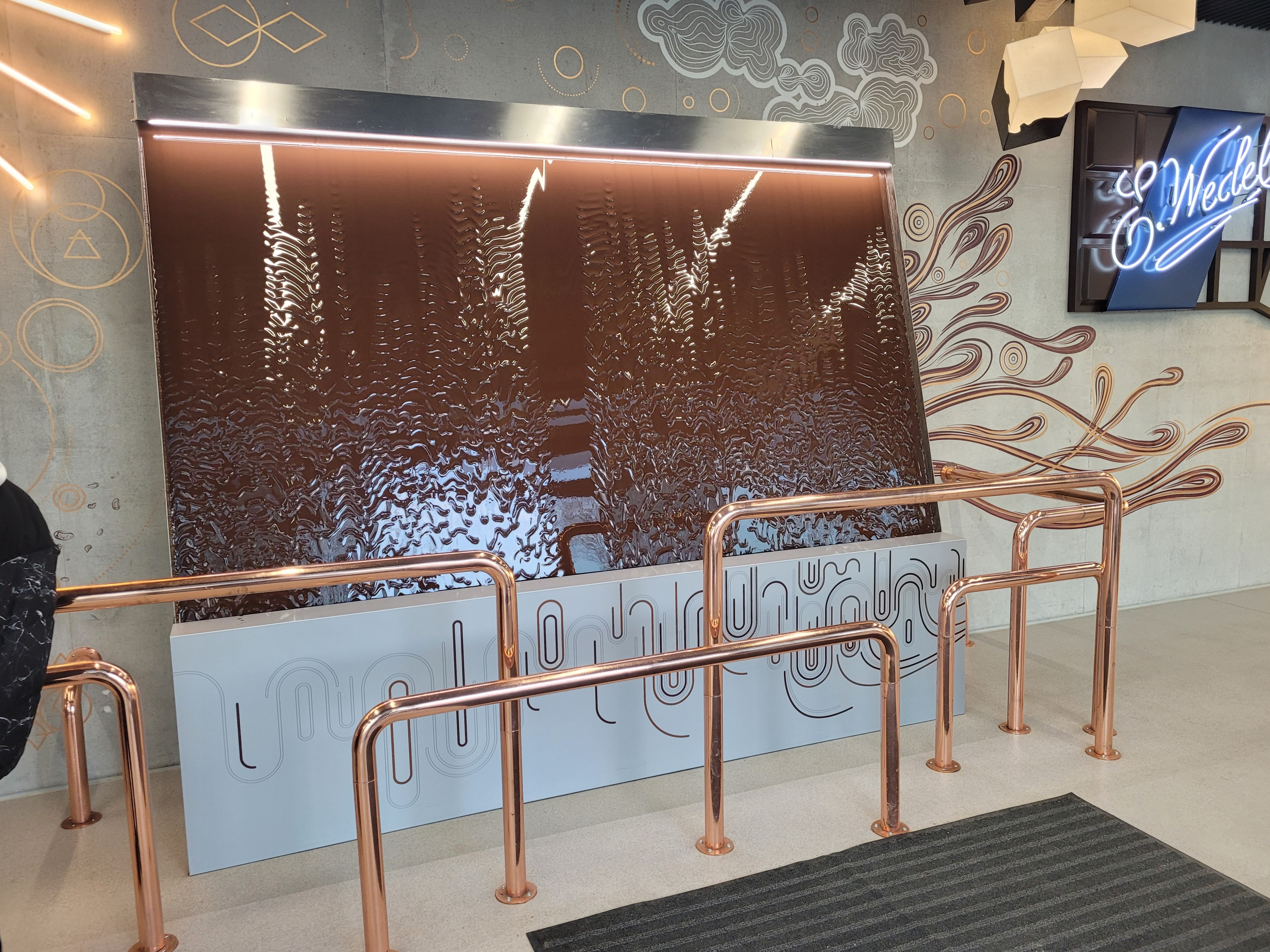
Plain chocolate waterfall in Wedel chocolate museum, Warsaw, Poland

== See also ==
- List of chocolate-covered foods
- List of dips
- List of fondues
