= Sterno =

Brand of denatured alcohol fuel in gel form

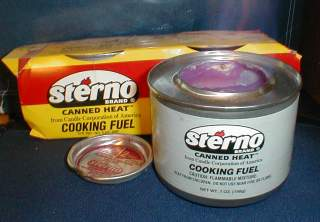
A can of Sterno aflame

Sterno is a brand of jellied denatured alcohol sold in and meant to be burned directly in its can. Popular both in commercial food service and home entertainment, its primary uses are as a fuel for heating chafing dishes in buffets and serving fondue. Other uses are for portable stoves and as an emergency heat source. It is also used with toy and model steam and other external combustion engines.

The flame is typically lit with a match or lighter and extinguished by placing the lid over the can to starve it of air, though any noncombustible cover will do.

== History ==
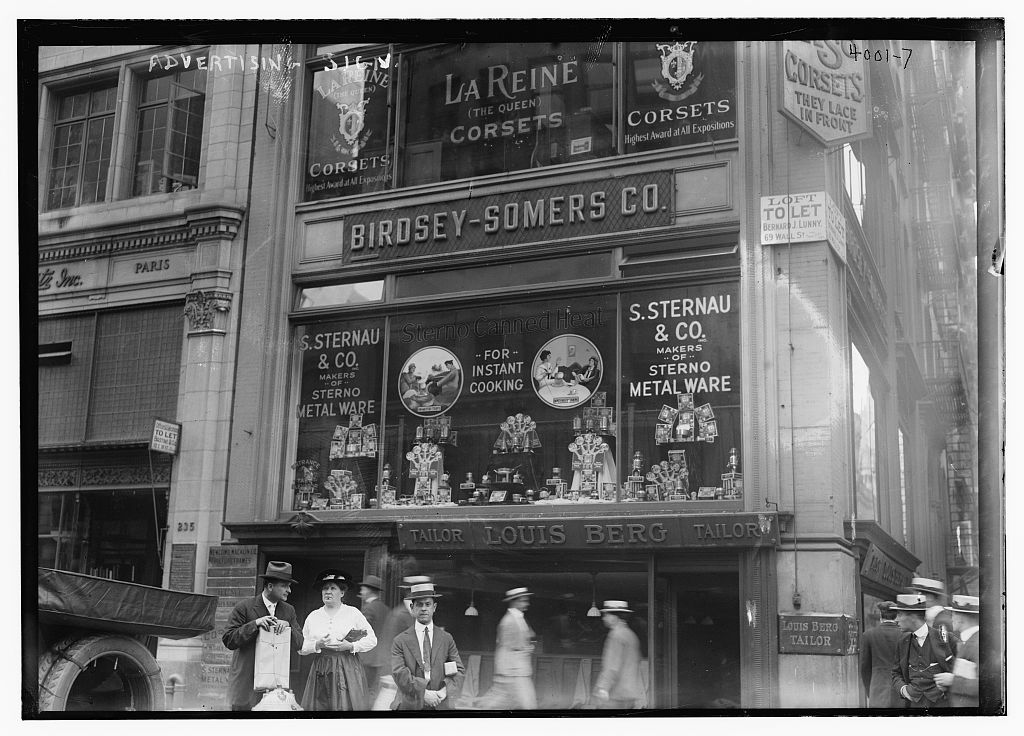
S. Sternau & Co at 233 5th Av., Manhattan.

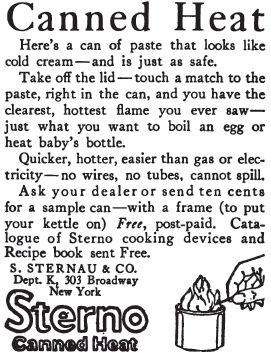
1915 magazine ad

The Sterno brand and trademark is owned by Sterno Products, a portfolio company of Westar Capital LLC, based in Corona, California. The brand was purchased from Blyth, Inc. in late 2012. Blyth had acquired the business from Colgate-Palmolive in 1997.

The name comes from that of the original manufacturer, S. Sternau & Co. of Brooklyn, New York, a maker of chafing dishes, coffee percolators and similar appliances since 1893. It had previously applied the name to its "Sterno-Inferno" alcohol burner. In 1918, it promoted its Sterno Stove as being a perfect gift for a soldier going overseas. In his book With the Old Breed, E. B. Sledge describes its use on the battlefields of the Pacific Theatre in 1944 and 1945.

Discovered around 1900 as a byproduct of the nitrocellulose manufacturing process, Sterno is made from ethanol denatured by adding methanol, water, and an amphoteric oxide gelling agent, plus, in recent decades, a safety dye that gives it a characteristic pink color. The methanol is added to denature the product, which is intended to make it too toxic for consumption. Designed to be odorless, a 7-ounce (200 g) can will burn for up to two hours.

== Abuse ==
Sterno contains methyl alcohol, which makes it poisonous. Moreover, the methanol can cause permanent blindness by destruction of the retina optic nerves. In spite of this there are many instances of people ingesting Sterno in lieu of ethanol (ethyl alcohol). Bluesman Tommy Johnson alludes to the practice in his song "Canned Heat Blues" recorded in 1928. (The blues band Canned Heat derived their name from the song.)

The practice is said to have become popular during Prohibition and the Great Depression, in hobo camps, or "jungles", when the Sterno would be squeezed through cheesecloth or a sock and the resulting liquid mixed with fruit juice to make "jungle juice", "sock wine", "squeeze", or "smoke".

The 1956 American documentary On the Bowery includes footage of three homeless men straining Sterno cooking fuel to make "squeeze" and then drinking the alcohol.

In an article for the Journal of the American Medical Association in 1961, Capt. James H. Shinaberger, MC, writes about a study of three people who had suffered methanol poisoning as a result of drinking Sterno. One of the patients "had been drinking Sterno for about a week and had been in the city prison for 48 hours when severe abdominal pain and vomiting occurred". According to one observer, the consumption of Sterno "results in a physiological and neurotic degeneracy which is as disastrous as narcotic addiction. ... Individuals habituated to 'smoke' ordinarily do not return to the comparatively mild effects of whiskey or beer." One substitute used in the absence of Sterno was kerosene mixed with milk, then boiled, skimmed and cooled before consumption.

In December 1963, 31 deaths in Philadelphia's homeless population were traced to a local store that knowingly sold Sterno to people for them to consume and get drunk. The Sterno involved in this case was a new type of industrial Sterno which contained 54% methanol, compared to approximately 3.75% in older types.

Orson Welles once threw flaming Sterno Cans at John Houseman which he would later describe on The Dick Cavett Show with both humour and regret.

== See also ==
- Beverage-can stove
- Calcium acetate
- Coleman fuel
- Hexamine fuel tablet
- Portable stove
