= List of fondues =

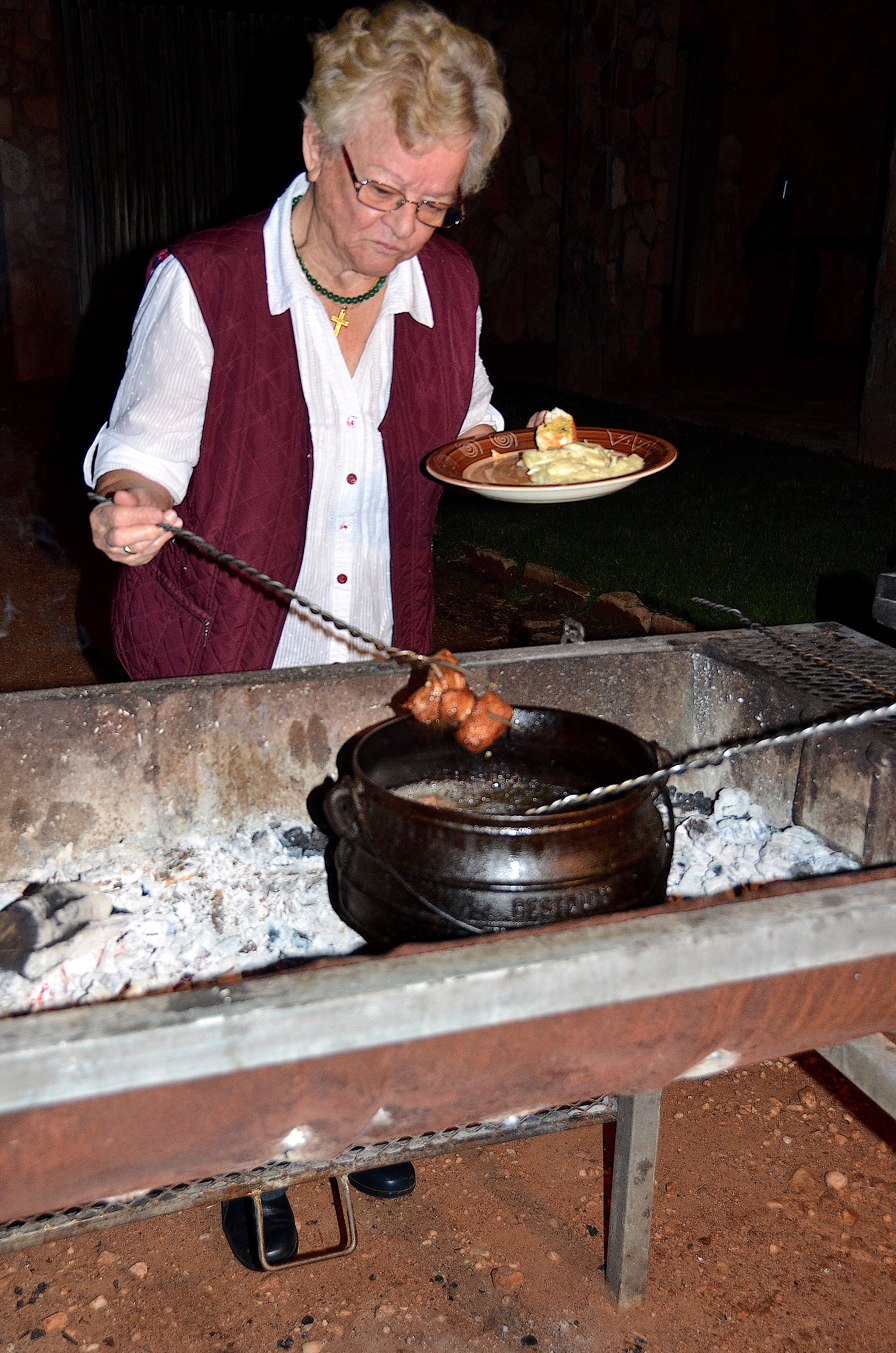
Bushman fondue in Namibia

Fondues are a group of distinct dishes that can be either savoury or sweet. Cheese fondue, originating in Switzerland, is the original fondue, hence the French term fondue for "melted". Since the 1950s, however, the term fondue has been generalized to a number of other dishes in which a food is dipped or cooked into a communal pot kept hot. Fondue eaten as a communal meal is referred to as a fondue party.

Konrad Egli, a Swiss restaurateur, is credited for the introduction of fondue bourguignonne at his Chalet Suisse restaurant in 1956. In the mid-1960s, he also invented chocolate fondue as part of a promotion for Toblerone chocolate. A sort of chocolate mousse or chocolate cake had also sometimes been called "chocolate fondue" starting in the 1930s.

== Savoury fondues ==
=== Broth ===
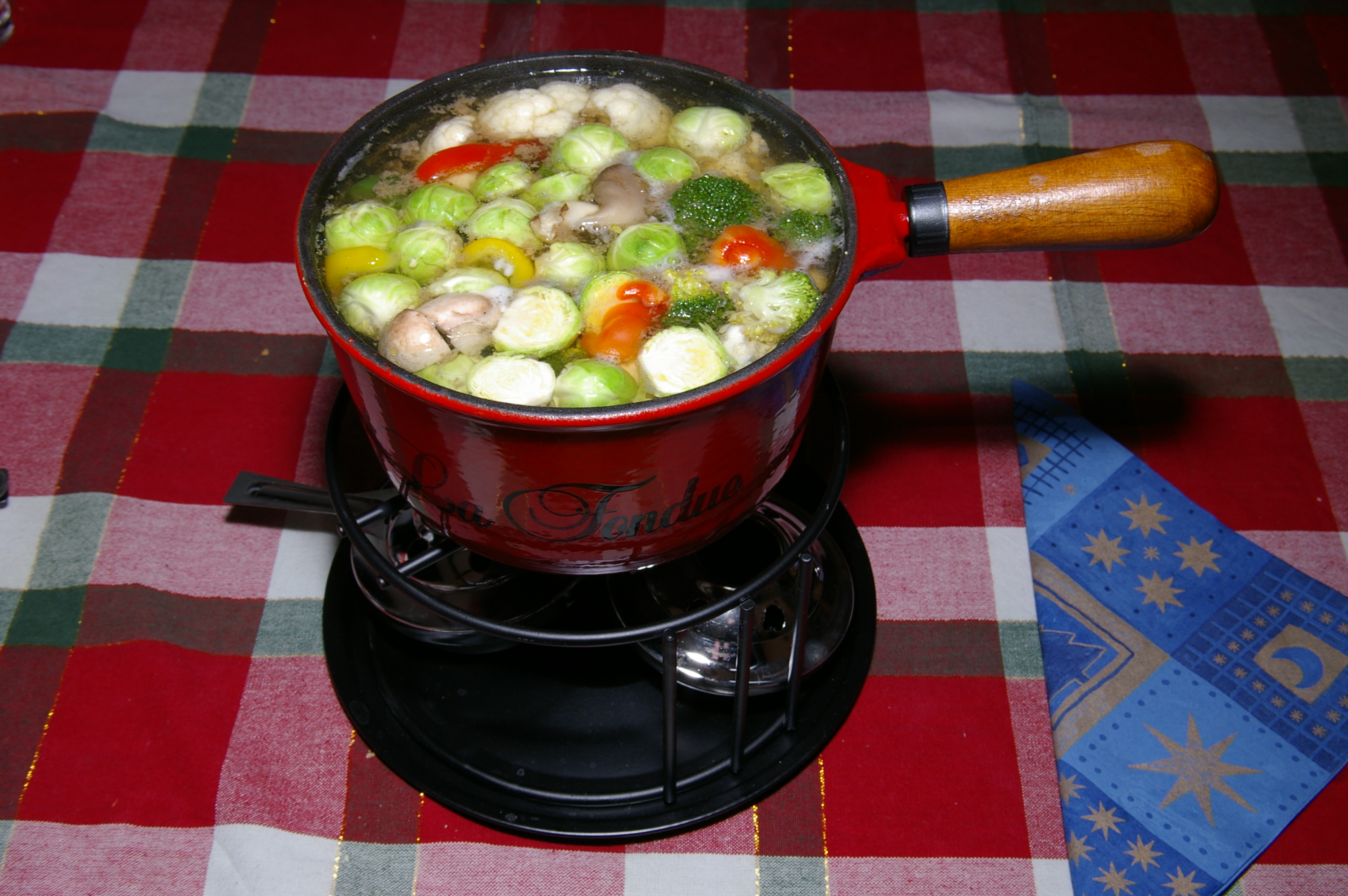
Fondue Chinoise

Fondue chinoise (lit. "Chinese fondue") is a common name for hot pot, where meat and vegetables are cooked in a shared pot of broth, or pieces of thinly sliced meat are dipped with a fondue fork into boiling broth with salad as side dish.

=== Cheese ===
Cheese fondue, commonly simply fondue, is a dish of melted cheese and white wine in which pieces of bread are dipped.

=== Oil ===
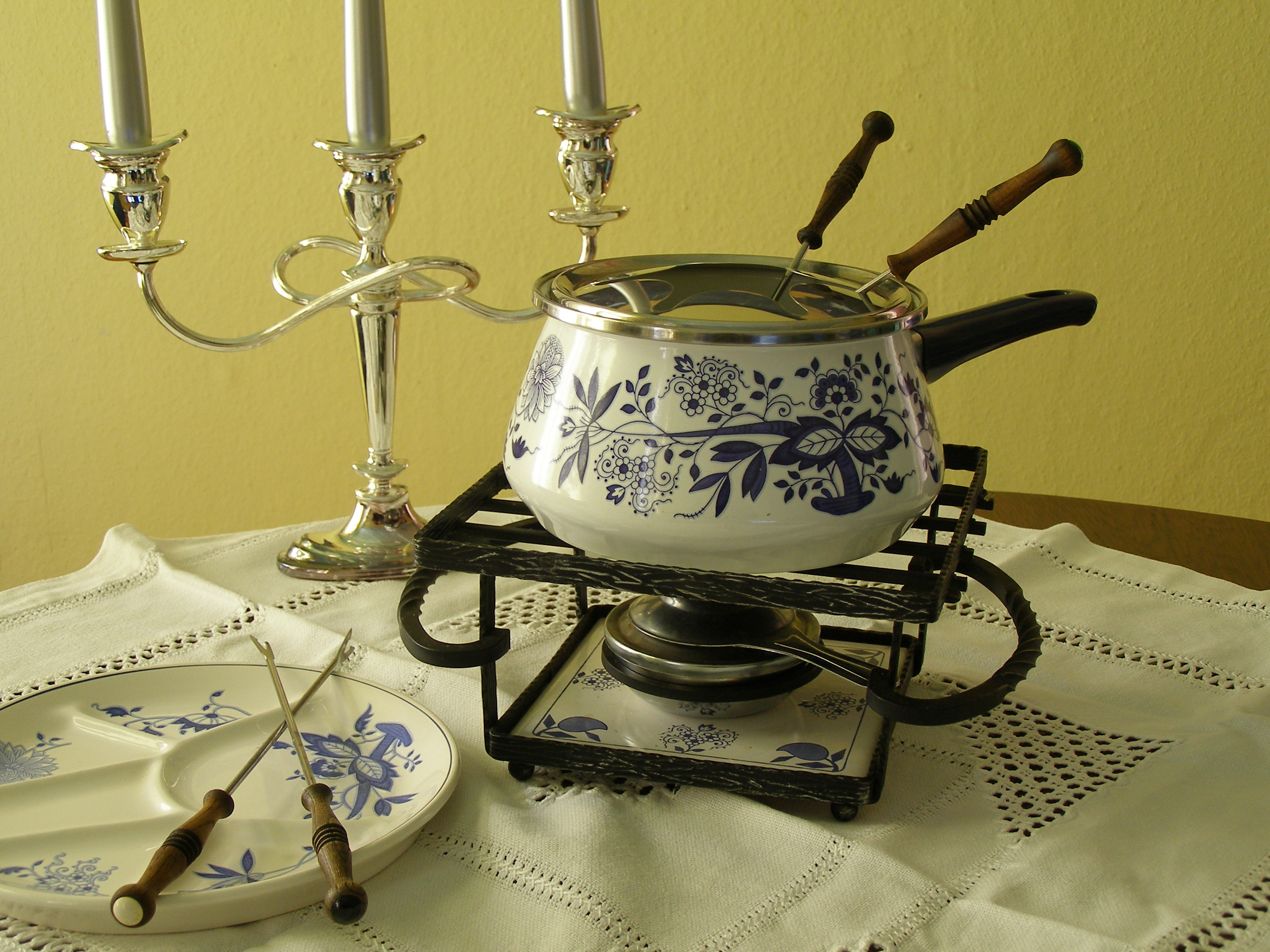
Fondue Bourguignonne

Fondue bourguignonne consists of a fondue pot filled with hot oil into which diners dip pieces of meat to cook them. Various dipping sauces are provided on the side. The meat is traditionally beef ("Charolais" beef produced in Burgundy particularly, hence the name "bourguignonne"), horse, venison, ostrich or duck, but other meats are possible.

Another oil fondue, common in Namibia, is the Bushman fondue.

=== Wine ===
"Fondue vigneronne" or "Fondue Bacchus" is like fondue bourguignonne, with wine or vodka rather than oil. Red wine fondue consists of red wine boiled, and seasoned with salt, pepper, garlic, onions and herbs; the white wine version is spiced with cinnamon, chilis, coriander, white pepper and enriched with chicken broth. The guests then dip meat, fish or vegetables in the caquelon and top them with bearnaise, tartar sauce or simply French mustard.

== Sweet fondues ==
=== Chocolate ===
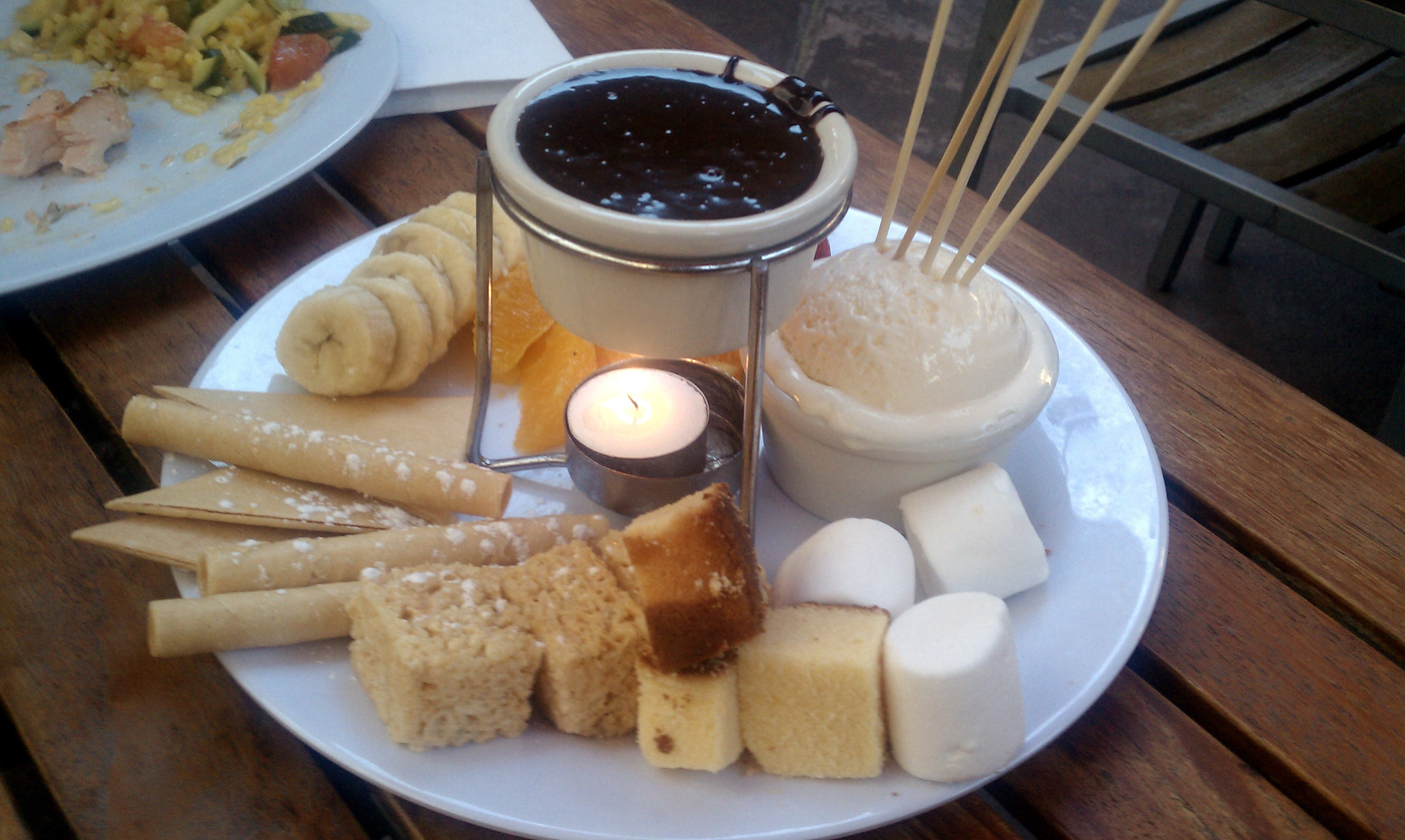
Chocolate fondue

Slices of fruit, cake or pastry are dipped in a caquelon of melted chocolate, often flavored with rum or kirschwasser. Dessert fondues may also be made with coconut, honey, caramel, or marshmallow. Chocolate fondue usually uses milk chocolate.

== See also ==
- Hot pot
- List of cheese dishes
