= Fondue =

Swiss melted cheese dish

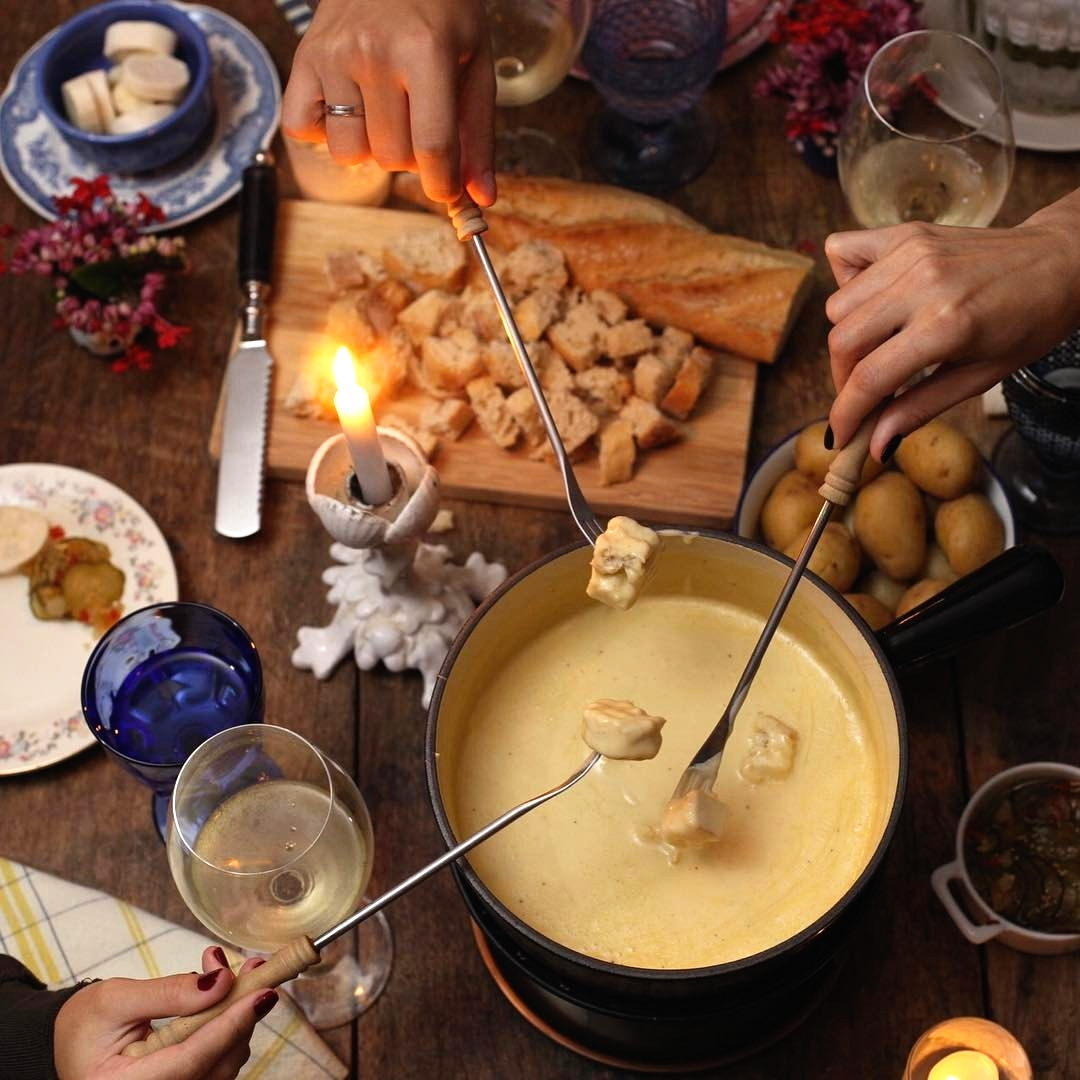
- Cheese fondue and bread cubes
- Course: Main course
- Place of origin: Switzerland
- Main ingredients: Cheeses, white wine, garlic, often kirsch

Fondue (UK: /ˈfɒndjuː/ FON-dew, US: /fɒnˈdjuː/ fon-DEW, French: [fɔ̃dy], Swiss Standard German: [fɔ̃ːˈdyː]; Italian: fonduta) is a Swiss dish of melted cheese and wine served in a communal pot (caquelon or fondue pot) over a portable stove (réchaud) heated with a candle or spirit lamp, and eaten by dipping bread and sometimes vegetables or other foods into the cheese using long-stemmed forks. As a way to increase cheese consumption, it was promoted as a Swiss national dish by the Swiss Cheese Union (Schweizerische Käseunion) in the 1930s.

Since the 1950s, the term "fondue" has been generalized to other dishes in which a food is dipped into a communal pot of liquid kept hot in a fondue pot.

== Etymology ==
The word fondue is the feminine passive past participle, used as a noun, of the French verb fondre 'to melt', and thus means 'melted'. It is first attested in French in 1735, in Vincent La Chapelle's Cuisinier moderne, and in English in 1878.

== History ==
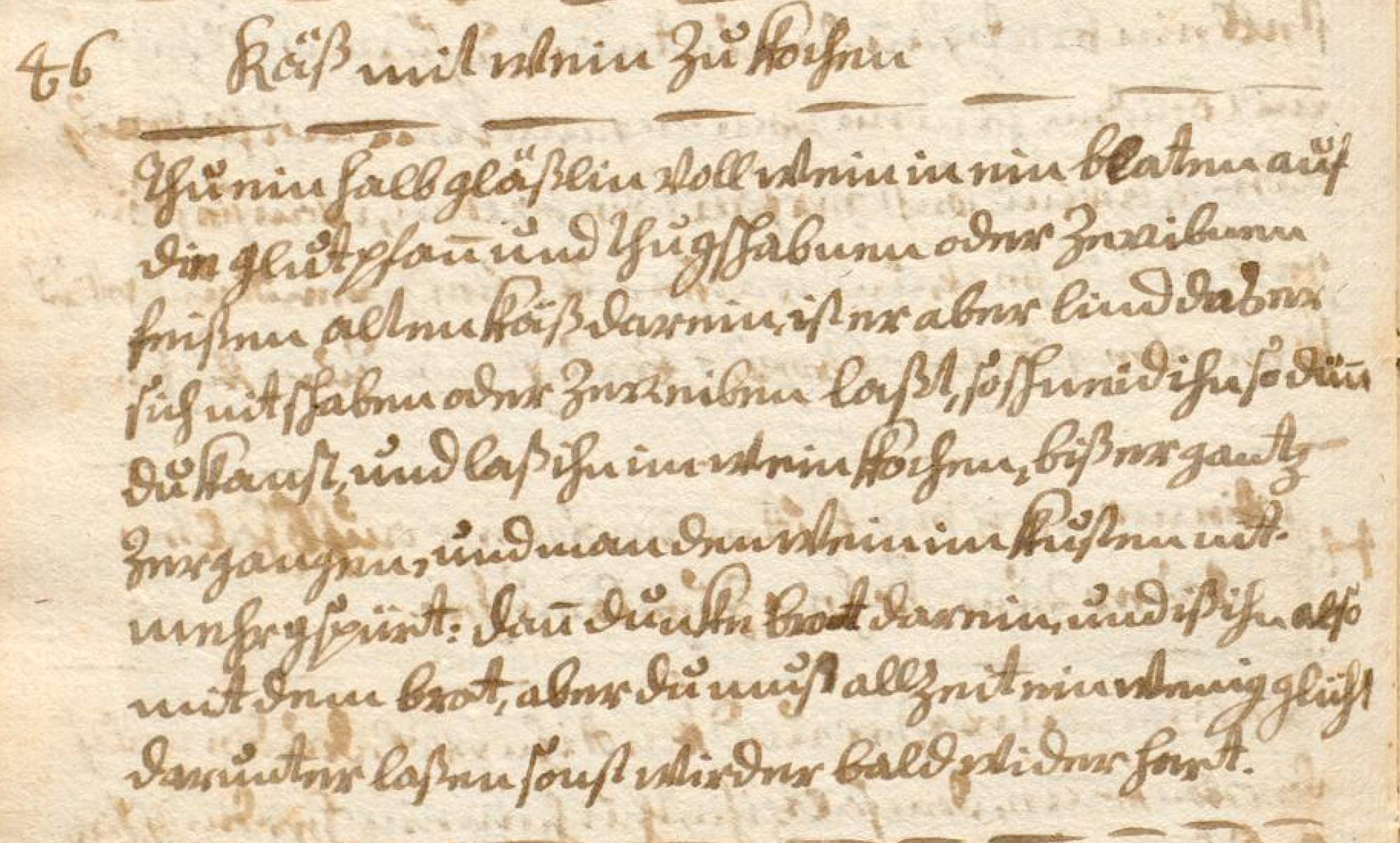
Recipe "Käß mit wein zu kochen" of the Koch-Buch by Anna Margaretha Gessner born Kitt from 1699

Although fondue is widely recognized as a Swiss tradition, its dates and influences reflect a broader European exchange of ideas, especially involving melted cheese dishes made with varieties such as Raclette and Gruyère.

The term “fondue” appears in written sources that predate the first widely recognized recipe from 1699, suggesting that the practice itself existed long before it was formally recorded. In the Alpine regions of Switzerland, where harsh winters and geographic isolation limited access to fresh foods, communities relied heavily on preserved staples such as aged cheese and stale bread. Rather than letting these ingredients go to waste, people developed practical methods of making them more edible. By melting cheese and blending it with wine, they created a warm, flavorful dish that softened hardened bread and provided a source of calories during colder months. As recipes became more standardized in later centuries—especially following the earliest documented cheese-and-wine preparation in a 1699 Zürich cookbook—the dish evolved beyond its rural origins. Eventually, fondue came to be embraced as a symbol of Swiss identity, reflecting both the country’s agricultural traditions and its emphasis on communal dining. By melting cheese and combining it with wine, communities were able to create a warm, shared meal using available resources. What began as a practical solution eventually evolved into a cultural symbol of Switzerland.

There has long been debate over what beverages should accompany fondue. The earliest known recipe for the modern form of cheese fondue comes from a 1698 book published in Zürich, under the name "Käss mit Wein zu kochen" 'to cook cheese with wine'. It calls for grated or cut-up cheese to be melted with wine, and for bread to be dipped in it.

However, the name "cheese fondue", until the late 19th century, referred to a dish composed of eggs and cheese, as in la Chapelle's 1735 Fonduë de Fromage, aux Truffes Fraiches; it was something between scrambled eggs with cheese and a cheese soufflé. Variations included cream ("à la genevoise") and truffles ("à la piémontaise") in addition to eggs, as well as what is now called "raclette" ("fondue valaisanne").

The first known recipe for the modern cheese fondue under that name, with cheese and wine but no eggs, was published in 1875, and was already presented as a Swiss national dish. Despite its modern associations with rustic mountain life, it was a town-dweller's dish from the lowlands of western, French-speaking, Switzerland: rich cheese like Gruyère was a valuable export item which peasants could not afford to eat.

With the introduction of corn starch to Switzerland in 1905, it became easier to make a smooth and stable emulsion of the wine and cheese, and this probably helped contribute to the success of fondue.

Fondue was popularized as a Swiss national dish by the Swiss Cheese Union (Schweizerische Käseunion) in the 1930s as a way of increasing cheese consumption. The 1939 New York World's Fair was the first international stage that the Swiss Cheese Union used to promote fondue. The Swiss Cheese Union also created pseudo-regional recipes as part of the "spiritual defense of Switzerland". After World War II rationing ended, the Swiss Cheese Union continued its marketing campaign, sending fondue sets to military regiments and event organizers across Switzerland. Fondue is now a symbol of Swiss unity. Fondue is also often associated with mountains and winter sports.

The extension of the name "fondue" to other dishes served in a communal hot pot dates to 1950s New York. Konrad Egli, a Swiss restaurateur, introduced fondue bourguignonne at his Chalet Suisse restaurant in 1956. In the mid-1960s, Egli invented chocolate fondue as part of a promotion for Toblerone chocolate. The original recipe featured melted chocolate, heavy cream, and brandy. This took off in the 1970s in New York which prompted many people to buy a fondue pot for at home which increased popularity.

A fondue party can be great fun

— "Betty Crocker", 1970

Fondue was again promoted to Americans at the Swiss Pavilion's Alpine restaurant at the 1964 New York World's Fair. Its popularity in the United States peaked in the 1960s and 1970s, along with other foods made in chafing dishes. Fondue was most often served at social gatherings and dinner parties.

Following fondue's international success, the Swiss Cheese Union continued to aggressively promote fondue in Switzerland with slogans like "La fondue crée la bonne humeur" 'fondue creates a good mood' and (1981, in Swiss German) "Fondue isch guet und git e gueti Luune" 'fondue is good and creates a good mood' – abbreviated as "figugegl".

The decades long cheese campaign in Switzerland ended in 1999 when the Swiss Cheese Union was disbanded due to corruption scandals and economic changes in Switzerland. The legacy of fondue as a symbol of national unity, however, is woven tightly into the modern Swiss identity.

== Preparation ==
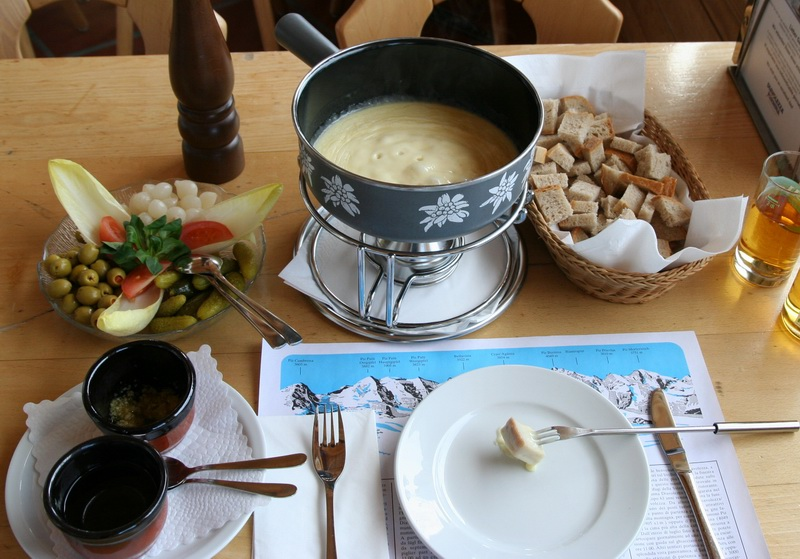
Fondue with common accompaniments in a Swiss restaurant: bread for dipping; kirsch; raw garlic; pickled gherkins; onions; and olives.

Cheese fondue consists of some variation of a blend of grated cheeses that are melted, usually wine (but sometimes beer as an alternative), a thickening agent such as cornstarch or flour, and seasonings. The proportion of cheeses to wine is typically in a 2-to-1 ratio by weight (e.g., 800 g of cheese to 400 ml or 400 g of wine).

Traditionally, the caquelon is rubbed with a cut garlic clove, white wine is added and heated with cornstarch, and then grated cheese is added and gently stirred until melted, although in practice all the ingredients can be combined and heated together at once. Some kirsch is often added. Fondue is very easy to prepare, even in large quantities.

The cornstarch or other starch stabilizes and thickens the mixture. Additional wine may be added if the fondue is too thick; its acid and ethanol decrease the fondue's viscosity. A fondue can curdle if the protein separates from the fat, which is usually the result of not enough liquid in the mixture and an insufficiently acid mixture, so lemon juice is sometimes added. (Lemon juice and wine both contain organic acids that chelate calcium ions, allowing casein to break down into smaller particles.)

=== Temperature and la religieuse ===
A cheese fondue mixture should be kept warm enough to keep the fondue smooth and liquid but not so hot that it burns. A typical target temperature is in the neighborhood of 65 °C (150 °F) as measured with a cooking thermometer. If maintained until the fondue is finished, a thin crust of toasted (not burnt) cheese will naturally develop at the bottom of the caquelon. This is called la religieuse (French for "the nun"). It has the texture of a cracker and is almost always lifted out and eaten.

== Variants ==
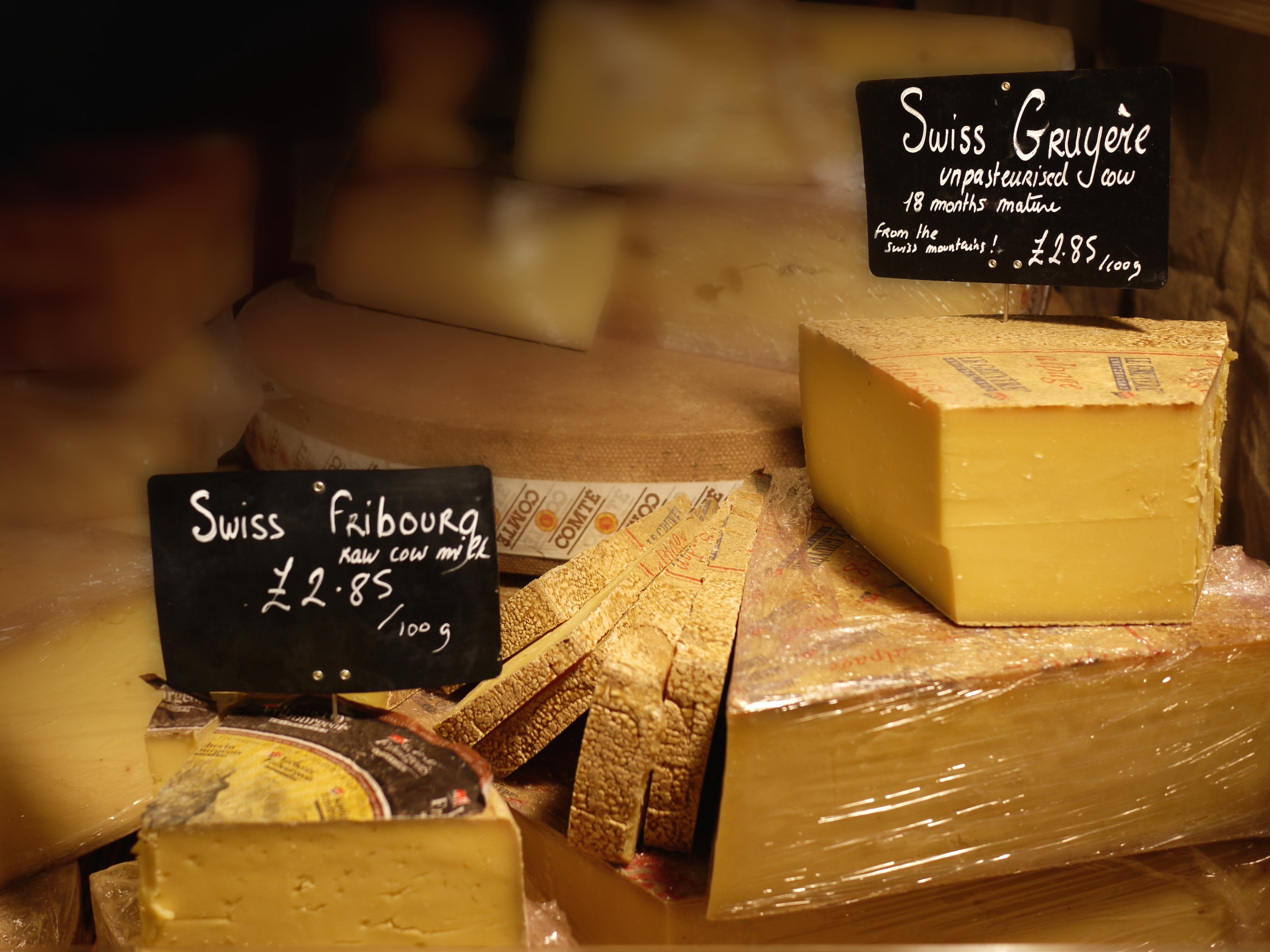
Vacherin Fribourgeois and Gruyère are commonly used for fondue.

Swiss Variants
| Name | Key Ingredient(s) |
|---|---|
| Vaudoise | Gruyère. |
| Fribourgeoise | Vacherin Fribourgeois. |
| Moitié-moitié | Gruyère and Vacherin Fribourgeois. |
| Neuchâteloise | Gruyère and Emmental. |
| Innerschweiz | Gruyère, Emmental, and Sbrinz. |
| Genevoise | Gruyère, Emmental, and Valais cheese. |
| Interlaken | Gruyère, Appenzeller, Emmental. |
| Appenzeller | Appenzeller cheese with cream added. |
| Tomato | Gruyère, Emmental, crushed tomatoes, and wine. |
| Spicy | Gruyère, red and green peppers, with chili. |
| Mushroom | Gruyère, Vacherin Fribourgeois, and mushrooms. |

Note that the regional names used for some of these variants are factitious, and do not reflect genuine regional traditions.

French Variants
| Name | Key Ingredient(s) |
|---|---|
| Savoyarde | Beaufort, Abondance or French equivalent of Gruyère or Emmental. |
| Jurassienne | Mature or mild Comté. |
| Auvergnate | Saint-Nectaire, Cantal and Fourme d'Ambert. |

Italian Variants
| Name | Key Ingredient(s) |
|---|---|
| Valdôtaine | Fontina, milk, and eggs. |
| Fonduta piemontese | Fontina, milk, butter, and eggs. |

American-Swiss Variants
| Name | Key Ingredient(s) |
|---|---|
| Chocolate fondue | Cream, brandy, and dark and milk chocolates. |
| Fondue bourguignonne | Tender meat (typically beef), neutral oil, and savory sauces. |

== Consumption and etiquette ==
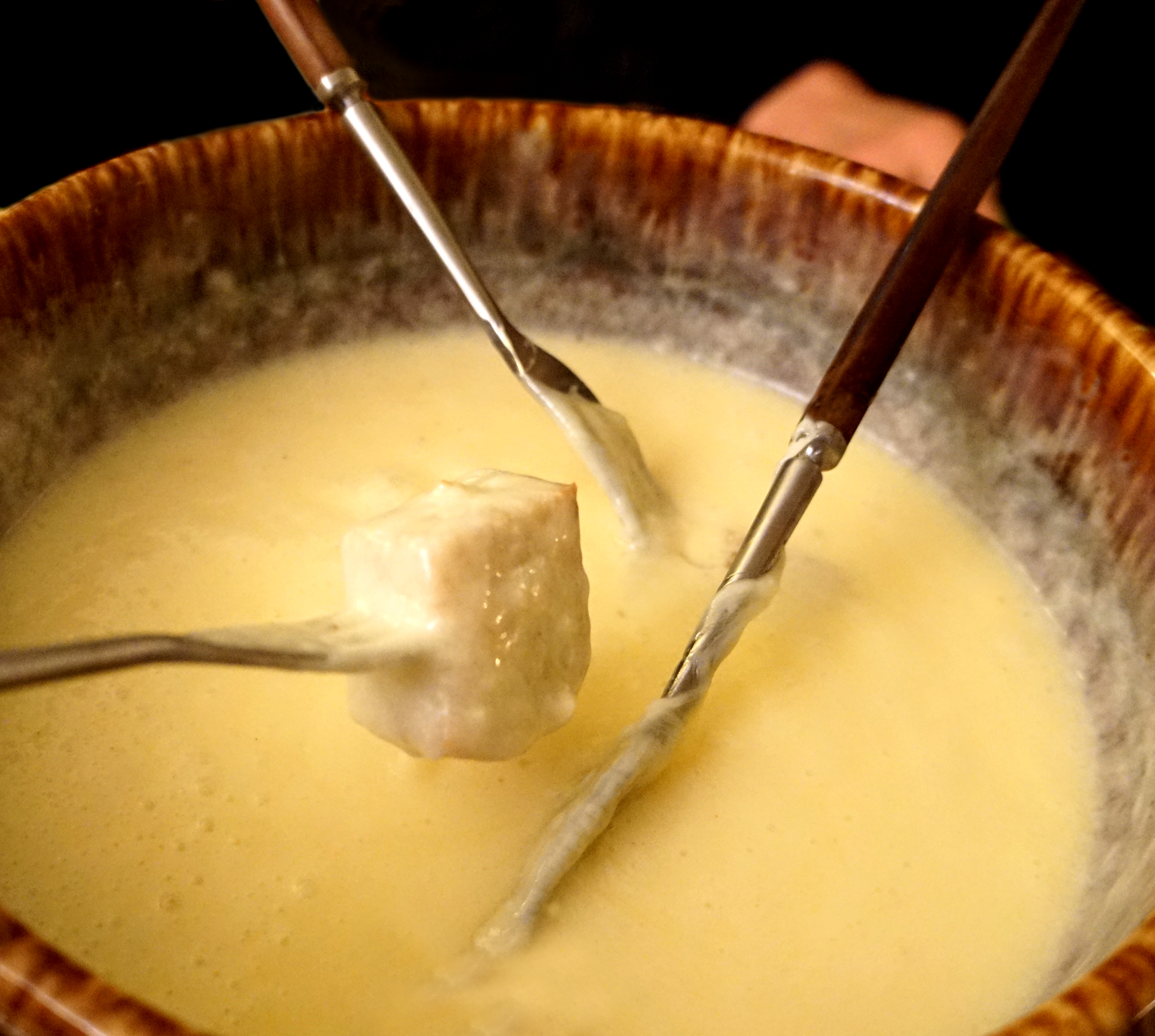
Close-up view of bread being dipped in melted cheese

Fondue is eaten by spearing a piece of bread on a fork, swirling it in the pot, and putting it into the mouth. Some writers recommend that the dipping fork be used only to transport the food from the pot to one's plate, not to eat from.

Losing a piece of bread in the caquelon is said to be penalized by buying a round of drinks, singing a song, or running around in the snow naked. This is parodied in Asterix in Switzerland, where a character is sentenced to be drowned in Lake Geneva after losing his third piece of bread. Other fondue etiquette rules include 'always stirring in a figure of 8', 'not scratching the bottom of the caquelon with a fork that has no side on it' and 'adding an egg and kirsch schnapps to the caquelon when the cheese is almost finished'.

There are various recommendations on the choice of accompanying beverage: some say white wine, others specify black tea. Some drink spirits during or after the meal, which supposedly helps digestion. Indeed, alcohol may provide short-term relief, but overall, it delays gastric emptying and prolongs perceived fullness. The delayed, strong feeling of fullness after eating fondue may be caused by phase separation in the stomach, the cheese fat initially floating in the stomach not being released into the duodenum, delaying fat sensing and satiation.

== See also ==
- List of fondues – other dishes inspired from fondue
- Bagna càuda – a similar olive oil–based Northern Italian dish
- List of dips
- Hot pot
- List of bread dishes
- List of cheese dishes
- List of cheese soups
- Raclette – another popular Swiss melted cheese dish
- Chocolate fountain
