= Anna Margaretha Gessner-Kitt =

17th-century Swiss bourgeois cookbook author

- Born: Anna Margaretha Kitt; October 8, 1652; Zurich, Switzerland
- Died: November 27, 1701 (aged 49); Zurich, Switzerland
- Occupation: Cookbook author
- Known for: Manuscript cookbook with 470 recipes
- Spouse: Johann Heinrich Gessner (m. 1676)

Anna Margaretha Gessner-Kitt (8 October 1652 – 27 November 1701) was a Swiss bourgeois woman and cookbook author from Zurich. She authored a comprehensive cookbook that provides insight into the consumption culture and dietary habits of the upper bourgeoisie around 1700.

== Early life and family ==
Anna Margaretha Kitt was born into a bourgeois family that had been established in Zurich since 1535. She was one of 19 children born to Hans Heinrich Kitt, a leather and fur merchant, and Anna Bertschinger. Her father managed the Schönegg estate in Erlenbach, which had been inherited through his mother, Margaretha Grebel (von Grebel), and oversaw the affairs of a mill called Kittenmühle in Herrliberg, which entered the family through his wife. The Kitt family resided in the house Zum Elsässer in the city of Zurich.

Of the 19 children, only four reached adulthood. Three of Anna Margaretha's siblings concluded matrimonial alliances with wealthy merchant families: the Werdmüller, Pestalozzi (ZH), and Hess (ZH) families. In 1676, Anna Margaretha married the merchant Johann Heinrich Gessner, who came from the prestigious Zurich family Gessner. He was in service to the cathedral chapter of Konstanz, managing their properties in the vicinity of Zurich.

The couple remained childless and lived on Kirchgasse in Zurich, in a house called Konstanzerhaus, which belonged to the cathedral chapter.

== Cookbook manuscript ==
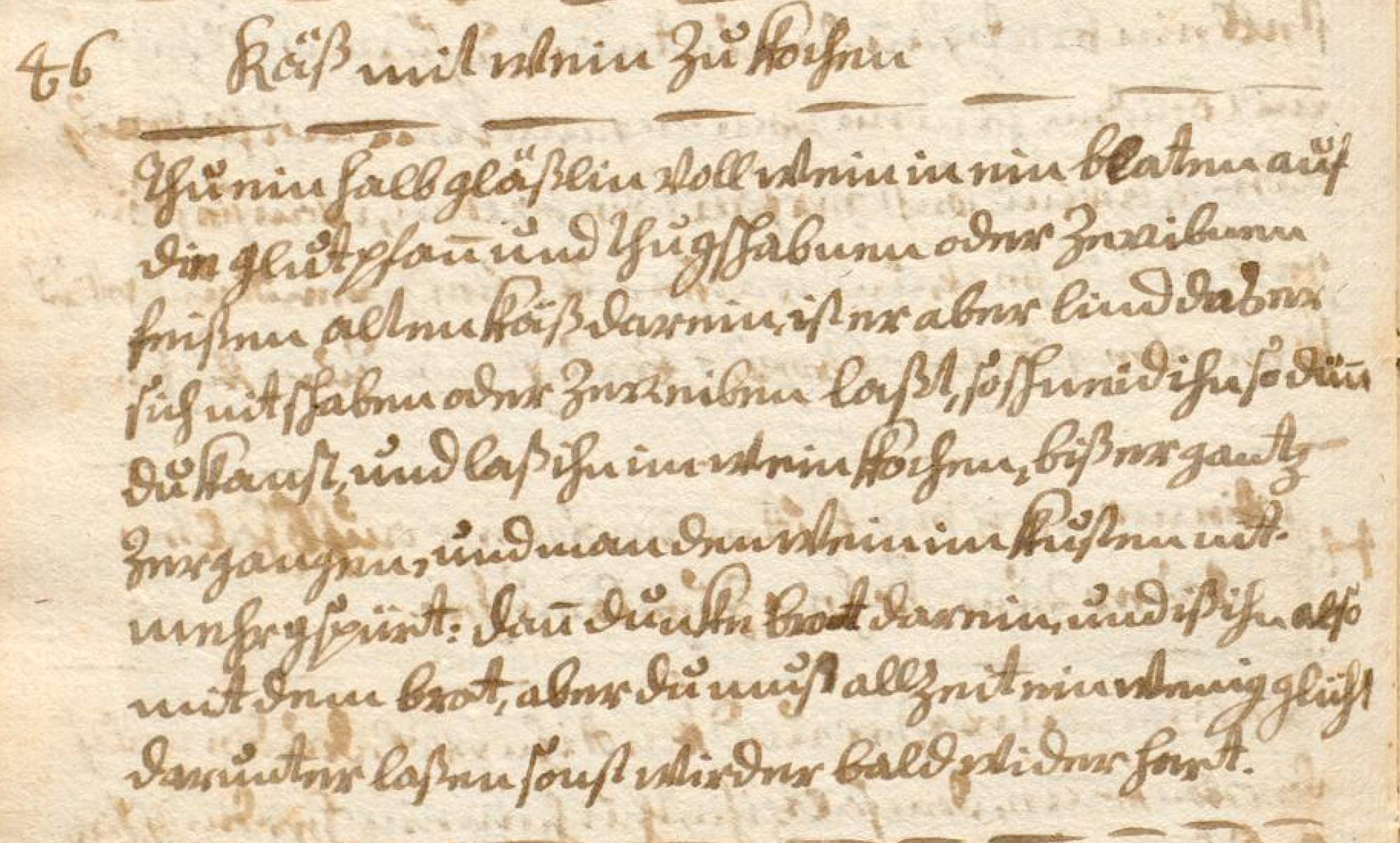
Recipe „Käß mit wein zu kochen“ of the cookbook

In 1699, Anna Margaretha Gessner-Kitt wrote a comprehensive cookbook containing 470 recipes for preparing meats, fish, poultry, vegetables, and side dishes. The manuscript, comparable to other handwritten cookbooks of the era, contained numerous refined dishes such as game and an almond pudding topped with golden glaze, while traditional oatmeal porridge, which fed broad layers of the population, was notably absent.

The cookbook included basic instructions for preparing turnips and preserving berries, as well as recipes for the sick and women in childbirth. Spices and sugar from the colonies were present in large quantities in at least four out of five recipes, demonstrating the household's access to luxury imported goods.

Anna Margaretha Gessner-Kitt's cookbook collection provides illumination on the dietary tastes and consumption habits of Zurich's upper bourgeoisie at the end of the 17th century. This social class, through its access to products from the colonies, distinguished itself from less affluent contemporaries through what economist Thorstein Veblen would later term "conspicuous consumption" (table manners). The manuscript, which remained unstained, was probably never used in the kitchen, and it cannot be determined with certainty whether its author wrote it with publication in mind. It is possible that Anna Margaretha Gessner-Kitt's death in 1701 prevented its printing.

== Bibliography ==
- Boesch, Ina: Weltwärts. Die globalen Spuren der Zürcher Kaufleute Kitt, 2021.
- Schmid, Denise; Imhof, Mira et al. (ed.): Das Kochbuch der Kittin von 1699, 2023 (with an introduction by Ina Boesch).
