= Chafing fuel =

Fuel for chafing dishes

Chafing fuel is a fuel used for heating food, typically placed under a chafing dish. It is usually sold in a small canister and burned directly within that canister, with or without a wick.

The fuel often contains methanol, ethanol, or diethylene glycol, as these may be burned safely indoors, and produce minimal soot or odour. These fuels are also used for emergency heating, outdoor cooking, and fondue.

== Types of fuel ==
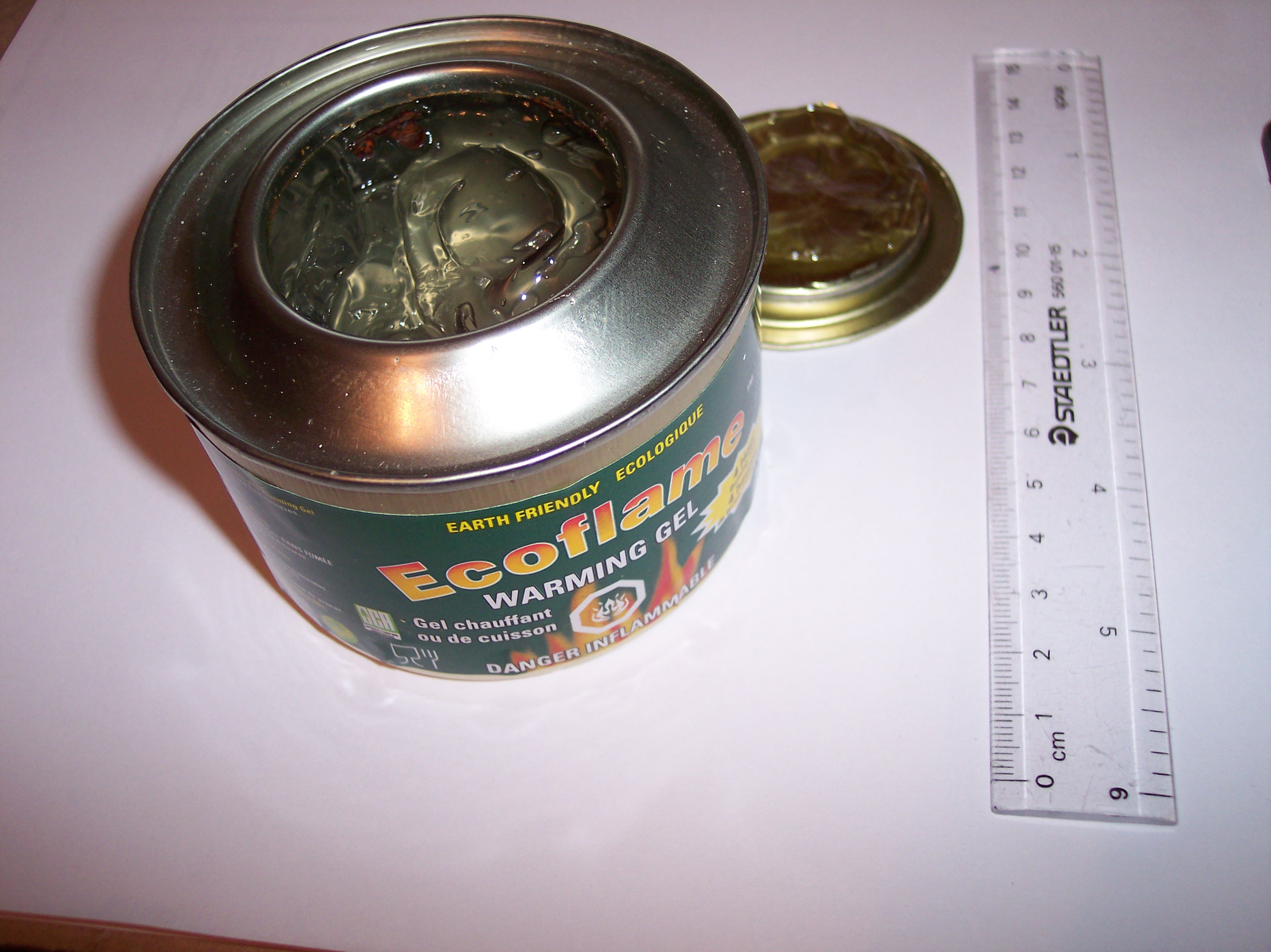

The first two fuels are similar with regard to consistency (both having a gel form though viscosities can vary with brand), operating procedures, and product design. The common gel methanol or ethanol chafing fuel is contained in a steel can with a resealable plug lid in sizes based on burn times. Two-, four-, and six-hour burn times are the most common sizes of methanol and ethanol chafing fuels available. The colour of the fuel being used can also vary among manufacturers.

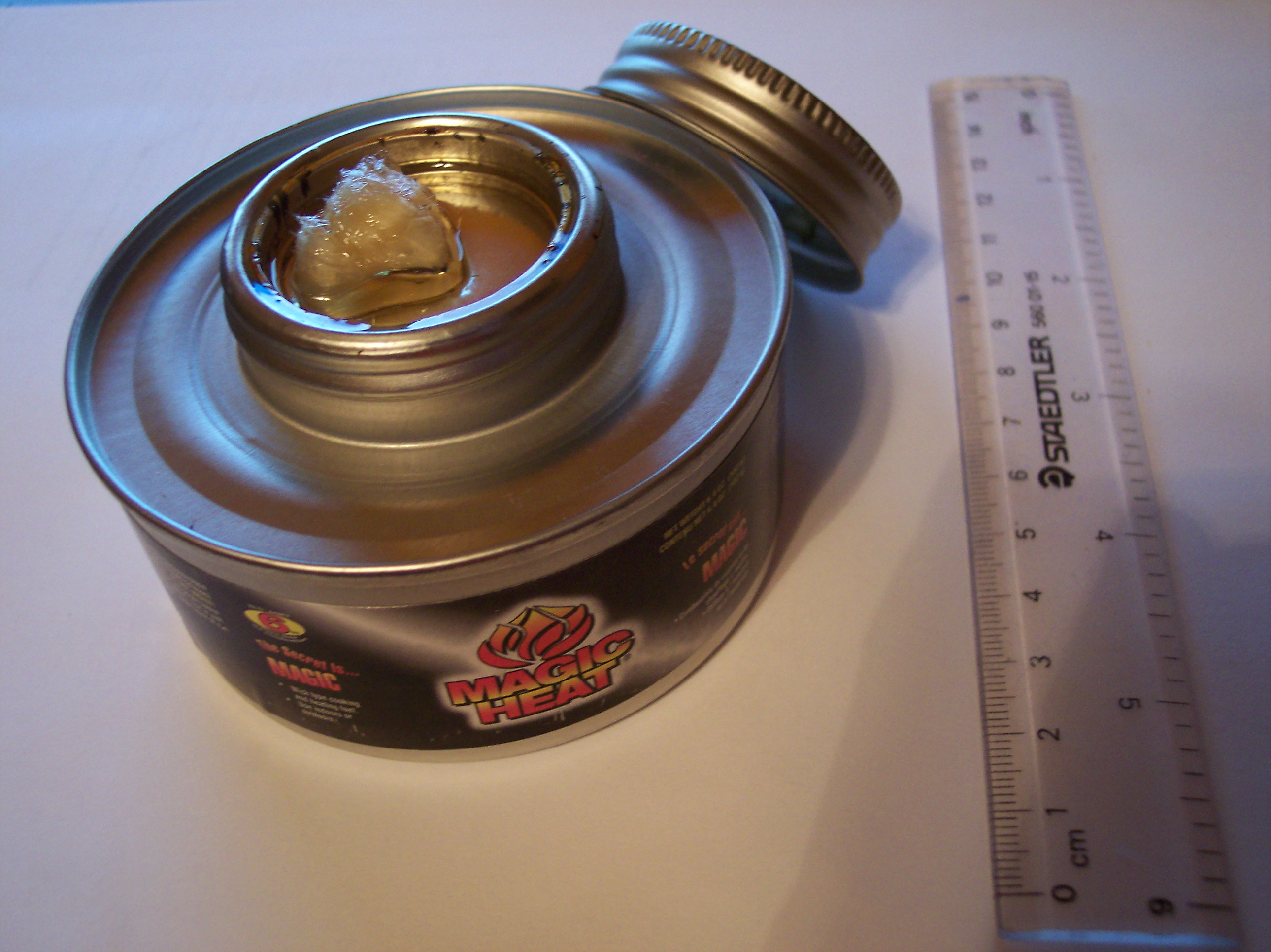

Both ethanol and methanol have low flash points, 11–17 °C, making them highly flammable; diethylene glycol, with a flash point of 154 °C, is considered safer because spilled DEG fuel will not combust; it needs a wick to burn. The fuel is in a liquid form and thus the canister in which it is contained usually differs by having a more leak resistant screw cap rather than a plug.

== Comparison of energy yield ==
Ethanol has a heat of combustion of 22.28 kJ/mL, similar to the 22.7 kJ/mL energy yield of diethylene glycol. Methanol is slightly less energetic, yielding 17.94 kJ/mL.

== See also ==
- Sterno
