= Fontina =

Italian cheese

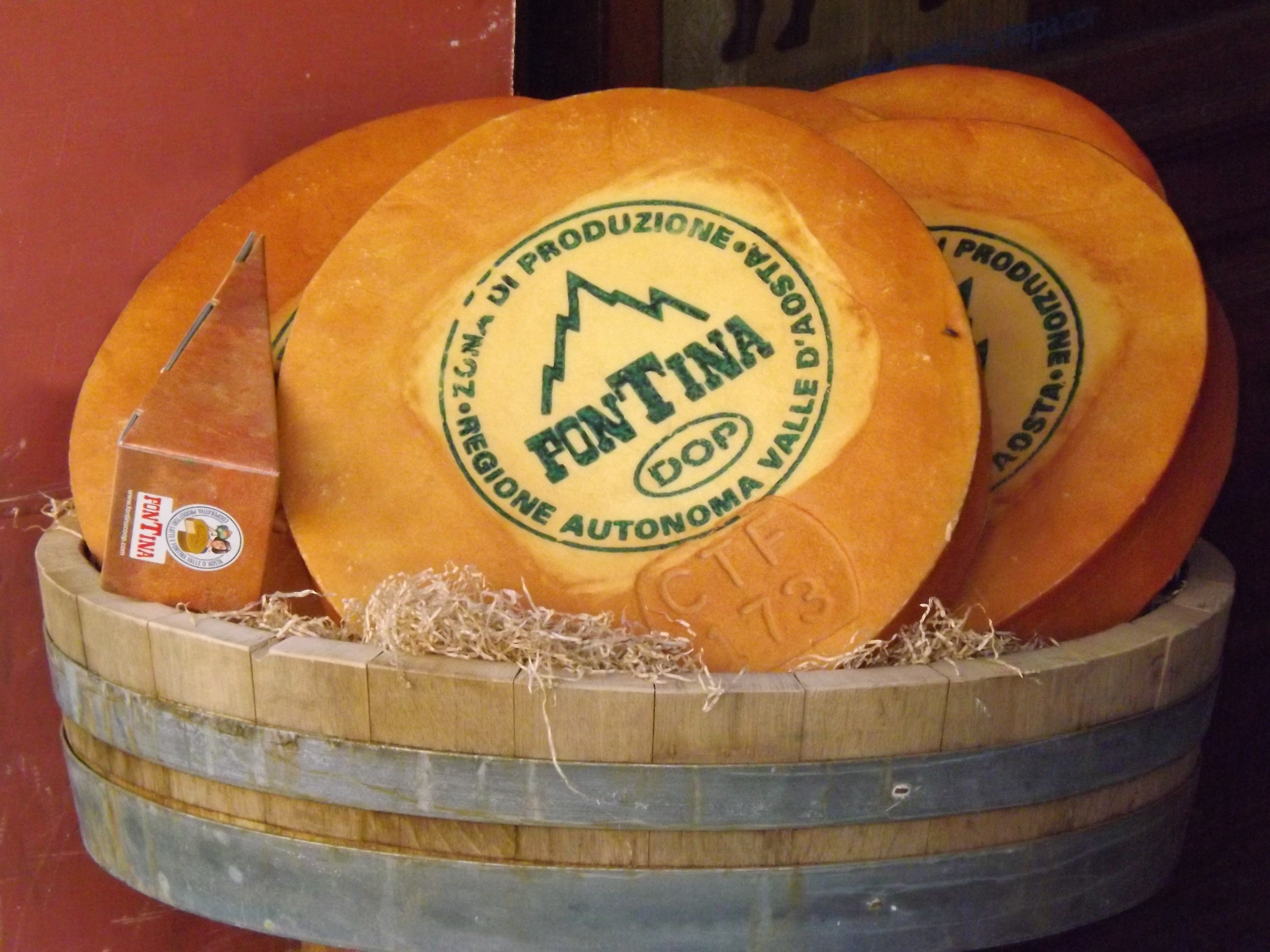
- Country of origin: Italy
- Region: Aosta Valley
- Source of milk: Cows
- Pasteurized: No
- Texture: Semi-soft
- Fat content: 45%
- Certification: EU: PDO 1996

Fontina (French: fontine) is a cow's milk cheese, first produced in Italy. Over time, production of fontina has spread worldwide, including to the United States, Denmark, Sweden, Canada, France, and Argentina.

== Description ==
Fontina is a cheese that is semisoft to hard in texture and mild to medium-sharp in flavor. It has a milk fat content around 45%. The characteristic flavor of fontina is creamy and mild but distinctively savoury and nutty, the nuttiness increasing with aging. Fontinas from Sweden, Denmark, and the United States have milder flavor, softer texture, and more holes than those of Italy.

Fontina cheese has been made in the Aosta Valley, in the Alps, since the 12th century. Fontina produced in the EU can be identified by a consortium stamp of the Matterhorn including the script "FONTINA".

As with many other varieties, the name "fontina" has derivatives such as "fontinella", "fontal", and "fontella". Although the version from the Aosta Valley is the original and the most famous, a derivative production occurs in other parts of Italy, as well as in Denmark, Sweden, Quebec, France, Argentina, and the United States.

Fontina produced in the Aosta Valley has a protected designation of origin, with regulations that it must be made from unpasteurized milk from a single milking, with two batches being made per day.

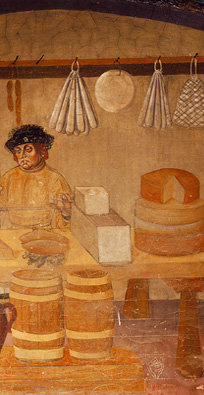
A 1480 fresco from the Issogne Castle: the forms of cheese on the right are thought to be the earliest depiction of fontina.

Aostan fontina has a natural rind due to aging, which is usually tan to orange-brown. The interior of the cheese is pale cream in color and riddled with holes known as "eyes". It is noted for its earthy, mushroomy, and woody taste, and pairs exceptionally well with roast meats and truffles.

== Recipes ==
Young fontina has a softer texture and can be suitable for fondue. Fonduta alla valdostana (in Italian) or Fondue à la valdôtaine (in French) is a traditional dish of fontina whipped with milk, eggs, and truffles. Mature fontina is a hard cheese, and still melts well.

Once suggested is a pairing with the Italian red wine grape variety Nebbiolo, which can have cherry, truffle, rose, and earthy notes.

== Generic nature of fontina ==
In 1986, the U.S. Trademark Trial and Appeal Board ruled that "fontina" was the generic name of a type of cheese "rather than a certification mark indicating regional origin, in view of the fact that non-certified producers outside that region use the term to identify non-certified cheeses". Today, fontina is produced in countries around the world, including the United States, Denmark, Sweden, Canada, France, and Argentina.

== See also ==
- List of Italian cheeses
