= Chafing dish =

Serving pan with a heater

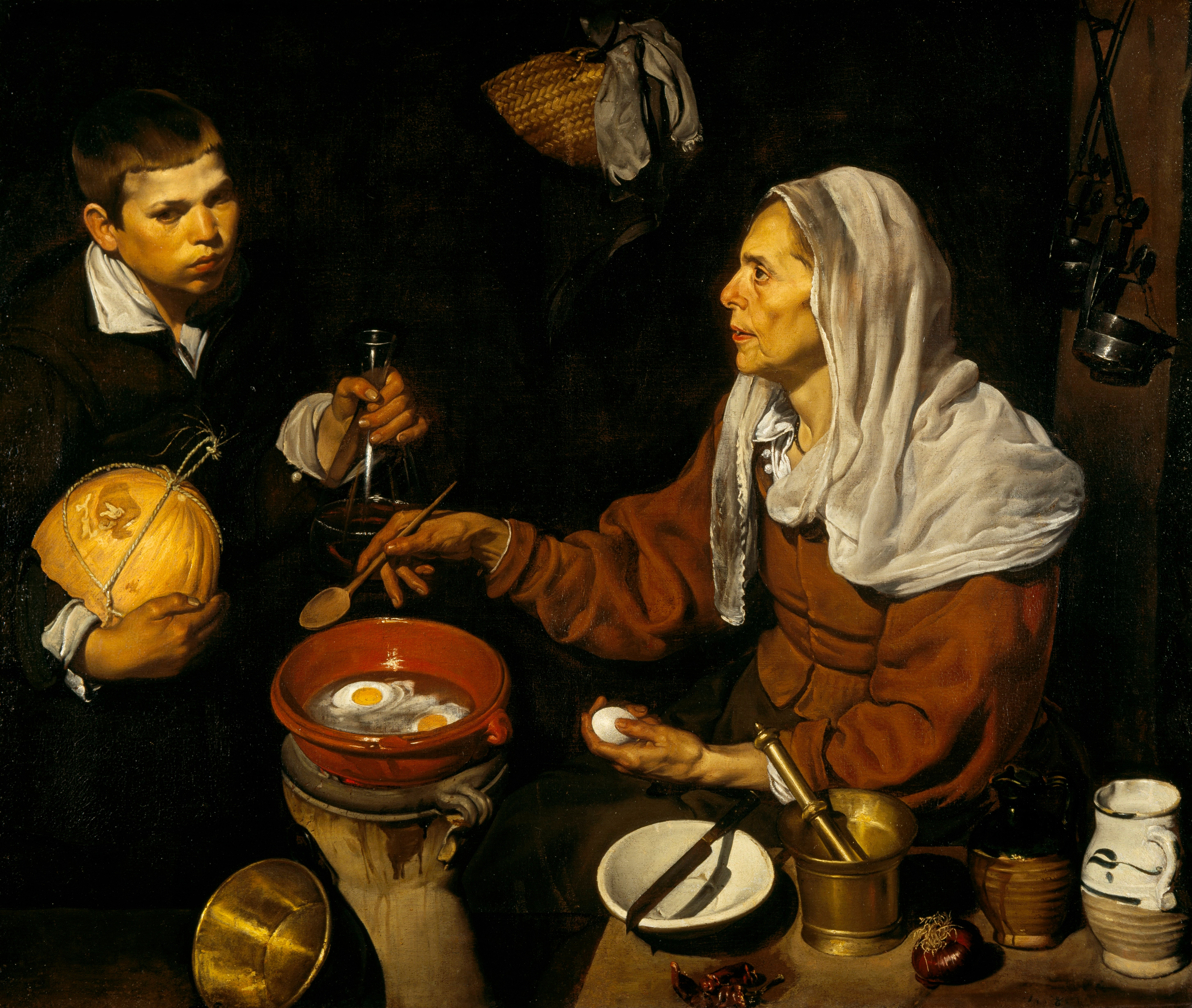
Diego Velázquez portrayed a woman poaching eggs in a glazed earthenware chafing dish over charcoal.

A chafing dish is a metal cooking or serving pan on a stand with an alcohol burner holding chafing fuel below it. It is used for cooking at table, notably in gueridon service, or as a food warmer for keeping dishes at a buffet warm.

Historically, a chafing dish (from the French chauffer, "to make warm") is a kind of portable grate raised on a tripod, originally heated with charcoal in a brazier, and used for foods that require gentle cooking, away from the "fierce" heat of direct flames. The chafing dish could be used at table or provided with a cover for keeping food warm on a buffet. Double dishes that provide a protective water jacket are known as bains-marie and help keep delicate foods, such as fish, warm while preventing overcooking.

== History ==
The Roman politician and writer Cicero described a "kind of saucepan of Corinthian brass", writing "This simple and ingenious vessel possesses a double bottom, the upper one holds the light delicacies ... and the fire is lit underneath".

Fragments of ceramic chafing dishes are common in the archaeology of medieval city sites, such as York, England. Chafing dishes in the form of charcoal-burning braziers are familiar in 17th-century American inventories almost from the start. François Pierre La Varenne, Le Cuisinier françois (Paris, 1652) mentions the use of a réchaut in a recipe for champignons à l'olivier. In describing the Velazquez genre painting (illustration), sometimes art historians not handy in the kitchen describe her as frying eggs in her earthenware dish. In 1520, Hernán Cortés reported to Charles V the manner in which Montezuma was served meals in Tenochtitlan:

He was served in the following manner: Every day as soon as it was light, six hundred nobles and men of rank were in attendance at the palace, who either sat, or walked about the halls and galleries, and passed their time in conversation, but without entering the apartment where his person was. The servants and attendants of these nobles remained in the court-yards, of which there were two or three of great extent, and in the adjoining street, which was also very spacious. They all remained in attendance from morning until night; and when his meals were served, the nobles were likewise served with equal profusion, and their servants and secretaries also had their allowance. Daily his larder and wine-cellar were open to all who wished to eat or drink. The meals were served by three or four hundred youths, who brought on an infinite variety of dishes; indeed, whenever he dined or supped, the table was loaded with every kind of flesh, fish, fruits, and vegetables that the country produced. As the climate is cold, they put a chafing-dish with live coals under every plate and dish, to keep them warm...

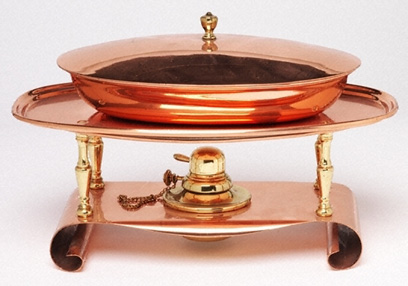
Chafing Dish and Stand about 1895 Victoria and Albert Museum, London

In England silver braziers without handles, upon which a dish would be set, are mentioned in the reign of Queen Anne; wooden balls kept the heat of the charcoal in the pierced container from being transferred to the table surface. Dish-crosses and the chafing dish with a handle were introductions of the reign of George II. In the American colonies, "One chafing dish" was inventoried among the silver at Abraham de Peyster's death in New York, 1728, though only two colonial New York examples are known to survive.

In a light form and heated over a spirit lamp, a chafing dish could also be used for cooking various dainty dishes at table—of fish, cream, eggs or cheese—for which silver chafing dishes with fine heat-insulating wooden handles were made in the late 19th century, when "chafing-dish suppers" became fashionable, even in households where a kitchen maid prepared all the ingredients beforehand. Specialized chafing-dish cookbooks appeared from the 1880s. A book of chafing-dish recipes printed for the silversmiths, Gorham Manufacturing Co. in New York, (2nd edition, 1894), featured a brief history of chafing dishes, followed by proper instruction for use, suggesting its novelty. Fannie Farmer's Chafing Dish Possibilities was published in Boston in 1898.

== Modern uses ==
Hosts dazzled their guests not just with their sparkling new equipment, but with their flambéing and their crêpes Suzette. Betty Crocker hailed the chafing dish... as providing dinners that were "exotic, sophisticated, and intimate."

— A History of Food in 100 Recipes

Modern chafing dishes are made of light metal or ceramic casseroles with handles. Standard uses of a chafing-dish in restaurants are finishing the sauces of dishes such as pressed duck and fettuccine Alfredo or in presenting flambé dishes such as crêpes Suzette and Steak Diane. In homes, it can be used to prepare and present dishes at table which must be kept hot, notably Welsh rarebit and cheese fondue. The home version sometimes includes a cover.

Home and restaurant chafing dishes have gone in and out of fashion, notably in the 1940s, 1960s, and 1970s.

In institutional and catering use, chafing dishes often consist of large, covered rectangular pans, sometimes disposable, held in a rack or frame over water heated by an alcohol burner as a kind of steam table for keeping food warm at a buffet. They are not used for cooking or reheating food.

== See also ==
- Chafing fuel
- List of cooking vessels
