= Granular cheese =

Type of cheese

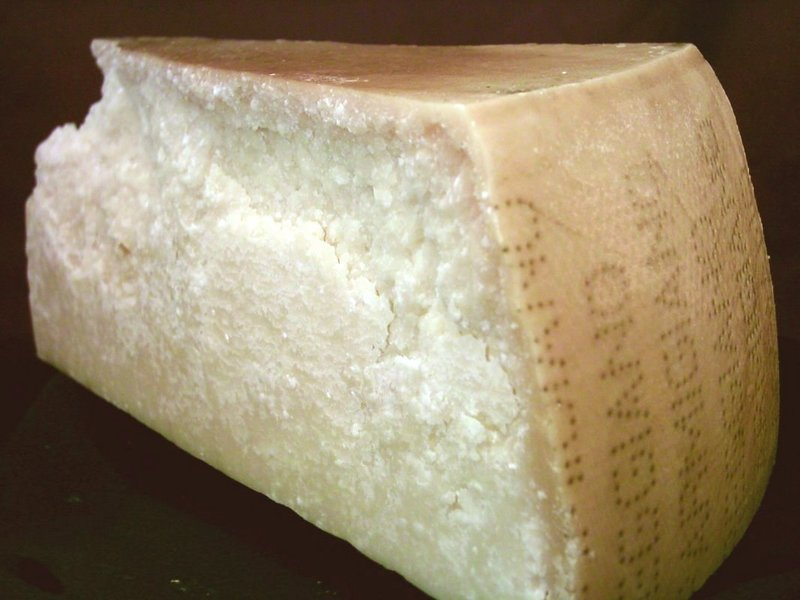
- Parmigiano Reggiano
- Country of origin: Multiple
- Source of milk: Cows and others
- Pasteurised: Sometimes
- Texture: Granular, usually hard
- Aging time: Minimum: 2 months Usual: 12 months

Granular cheese, also known as stirred curd cheese and hard cheese, is a type of cheese produced by repeatedly stirring and draining a mixture of curd and whey. It can refer to a wide variety of cheeses, including the grana cheeses such as Parmigiano Reggiano and various others.

== Examples ==
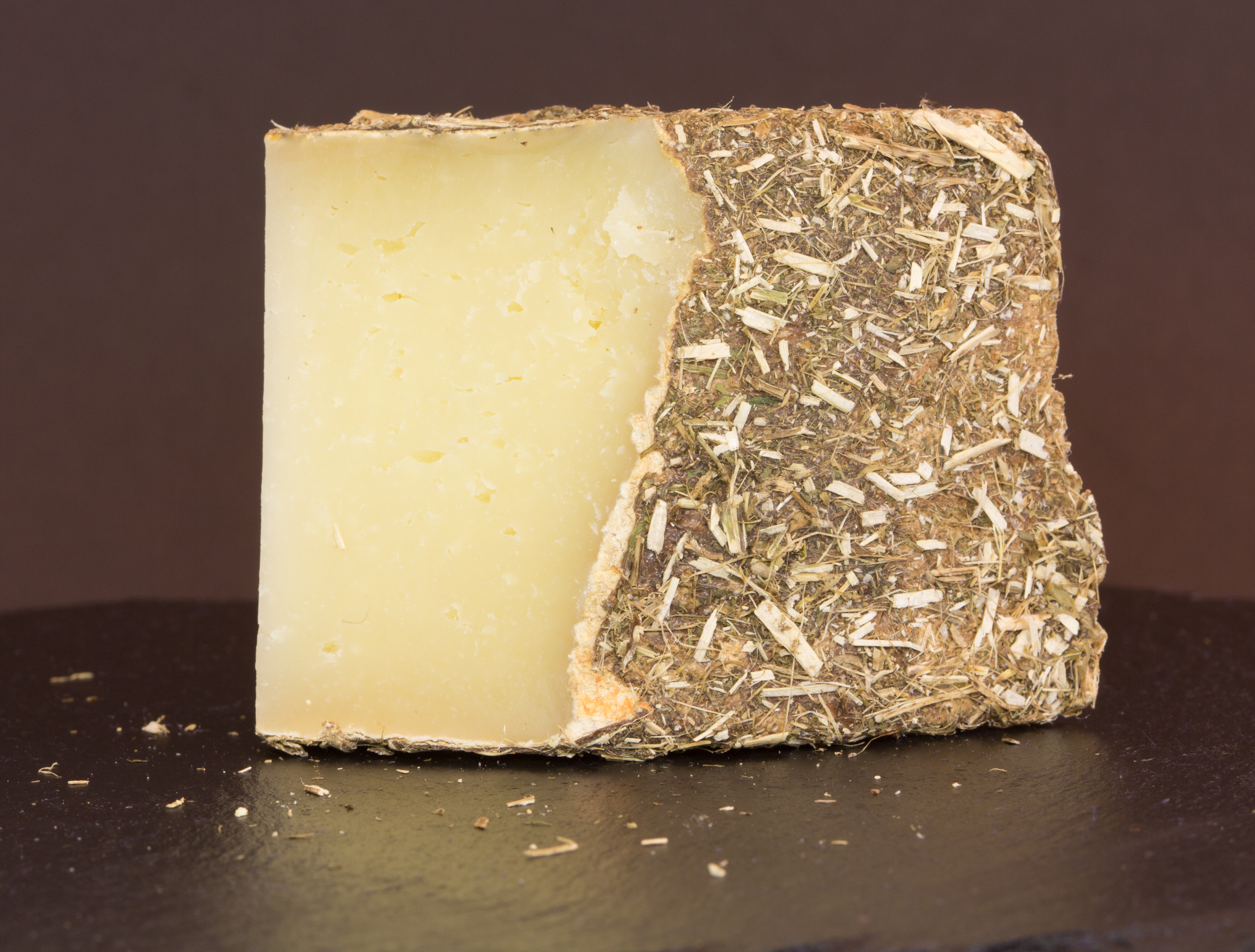
Pecorino di grotta

Instances of granular cheese types are:

- Parmigiano Reggiano (Italy)
- Grana Padano (Italy)
- Pecorino (Italy)
- Appenzeller (Switzerland)
- Bergkäse (Austria/Germany/Switzerland)
- Manchego (Spain)
- Dubliner (Ireland)
- Cheddar (UK)

== Production ==
Although granular cheese can be created using any method that achieves the designated standard for physical and chemical properties, there is one method that is generally used. First, the milk or cream may be warmed and treated with hydrogen peroxide and catalase, producing water and oxygen gas. Then, a lactic acid-producing bacterial culture is added, and the product is treated with clotting enzymes to form a semisolid mass. This mass is cut, stirred, and heated to separate the curd and the whey. Increasing the amount of time between cutting and heating will increase both the final moisture content and the milkfat content of the cheese, thereby increasing the yield. There follows an alternating cycle of draining of the whey and stirring. After most of the whey has been drained, the curd is salted, drained, and pressed into the desired form. The remaining product may be cured if the original dairy products were not pasteurized. A common method of curing is to dry the cheese on racks for about a week, then to wax it and place it in coolers until the time of consumption.

== Taste ==
Granular cheese is rich and tangy. Although unpasteurized granular cheese is ready to eat after 60 days of curing, it has a very mild flavor unless aged further to increase sharpness. The cheese is sharpest after 12 months of aging, after which it is usually sold. Granular cheese can contain cheese crystals, semi-solid to gritty crystalline spots.

== U.S. Food and Drug Administration standards ==
In the United States, the FDA mandates certain qualifications for something to be called granular cheese. The maximum allowed moisture content is 39 percent, and the minimum allowed milkfat content is 50 percent by weight of the solids. Regular granular cheese must either use pasteurized dairy products or be cured for at least 60 days at a temperature of at least 35 °F. Either cows' milk or cream may be used as the main ingredient. Other permissible ingredients include clotting enzymes such as rennet, coloring, calcium chloride as a coagulation aid, enzymes used in curing, hydrogen peroxide, and agents used to protect against fungi. The name granular cheese can encompass many types of cheeses; for example, Parmigiano Reggiano is a granular cheese.

Granular cheese for manufacturing must meet all of these standards except that it does not need to be cured, nor do the dairy ingredients used need to be pasteurized. This is the type of granular cheese most commonly used for processing.

== See also ==
- Types of cheese
- List of cheeses
