= Gran Moravia =

Hard grana-style cheese produced in the Czech Republic

- Country of origin: Czech Republic
- Region: Moravia (Litovel)
- Source of milk: Cows
- Pasteurised: No
- Texture: Hard

Gran Moravia is a long-aged, hard grana-style cheese produced in Litovel in Moravia (Czech Republic). It is made from cow's milk and is intended for both table use and grating, in a style comparable to Italian grana cheeses. The cheese was developed in the early 21st century and is a relatively recent addition to the grana-style cheese family.

The cheese is produced by Brazzale Moravia a.s., part of the Italian Brazzale Group, and most of its production is sold abroad, particularly to Italy.

== Origin ==
Gran Moravia was developed in the early 2000s as a grana-style cheese produced outside Italy, using milk from Moravia. Czech and Italian press coverage has frequently noted its recent origin in contrast to traditional Italian grana cheeses with medieval or early modern histories.

== Production and ripening ==
Gran Moravia is manufactured from Czech Milk in Litovel and then ripened for part of its maturation in the Veneto region of Italy. They were originally ripened in a traditional warehouse, but since 2021 have used a large robotised ripening warehouse. Regional reporting has likewise described the cheese's ageing and associated logistics in northern Italy, including facilities in the Alpine foothills.

== Market and sales ==
Business reporting based on company financial results has described Brazzale Moravia as a major exporter within the Czech dairy sector, with most production sold abroad.

== Sustainability and carbon-neutral claims ==
Production of Gran Moravia is carbon neutral, including emissions compensation measures, such as large-scale tree planting associated with its overseas activities; these claims were reported as having been verified by third-party certification. Institutional profiles and subsequent reporting have repeated these sustainability claims in connection with Gran Moravia and the wider Brazzale supply chain.

== See also ==
- Grana Padano
- Parmigiano-Reggiano
- Grana (cheese)
