= Dubliner Cheese =

Brand of Irish cheese

Dubliner
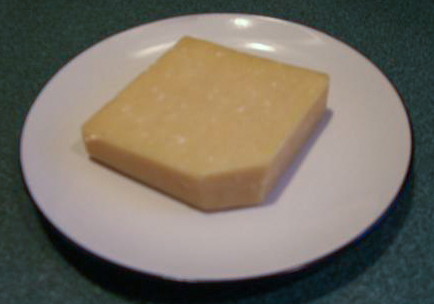
- Country of origin: Ireland
- Town: County Cork
- Source of milk: Cows
- Texture: Hard
- Aging time: 12 months to two years

Dubliner is a sweet, granular cheese made from pasteurised cow's milk aged over a year and manufactured by Carbery, located in County Cork, Ireland. Since 1996, it has been marketed internationally by Ornua (formerly the Irish Dairy Board) under the Kerrygold label. The cheese is named after the city of Dublin, although it is made in County Cork.

The cheese aims to combine the sharpness of mature cheddar and the buttery sweetness of Parmigiano. Dubliner cheese may contain natural calcium lactate cheese crystals, which appear as small white pieces.

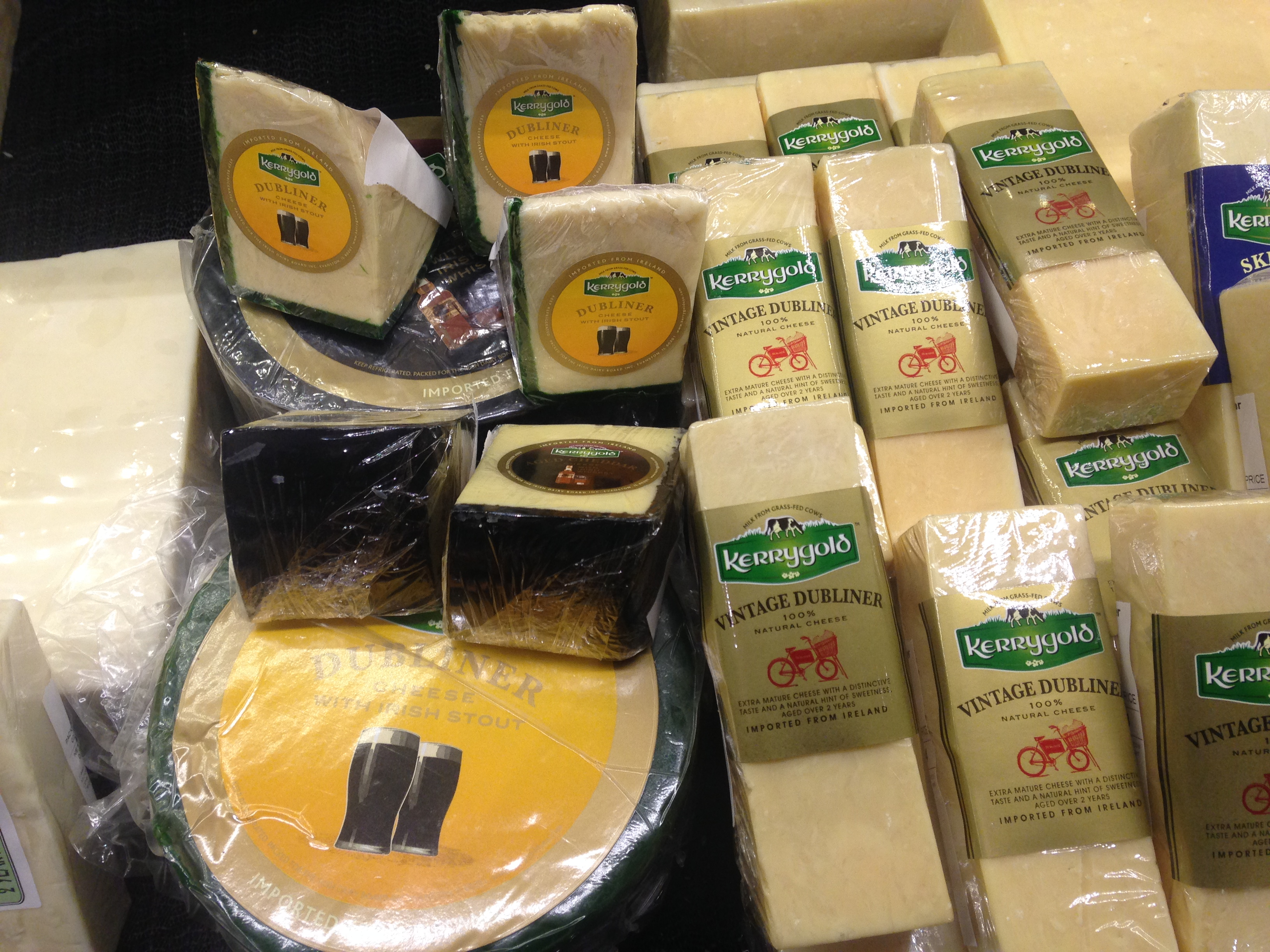
Kerrygold Dubliner in the United States

== History ==
John Lucey, an Irishman, created a cheese called "Araglen" in 1990; his goal was to produce an alternative to Cheddar cheese that could be manufactured "using (mostly) existing Cheddar equipment, for sale in Europe." A year later, Carbery Milk Products signed an agreement to commercialize Araglen. Commercial production began in 1994; five years later, it was introduced to the United States, and by 2011, more than 40,000 tonnes (44,000 tons) had been produced for sale in multiple markets.

== See also ==
- List of cheeses
