= Cheese knife =

Type of knife used for cutting or serving cheese

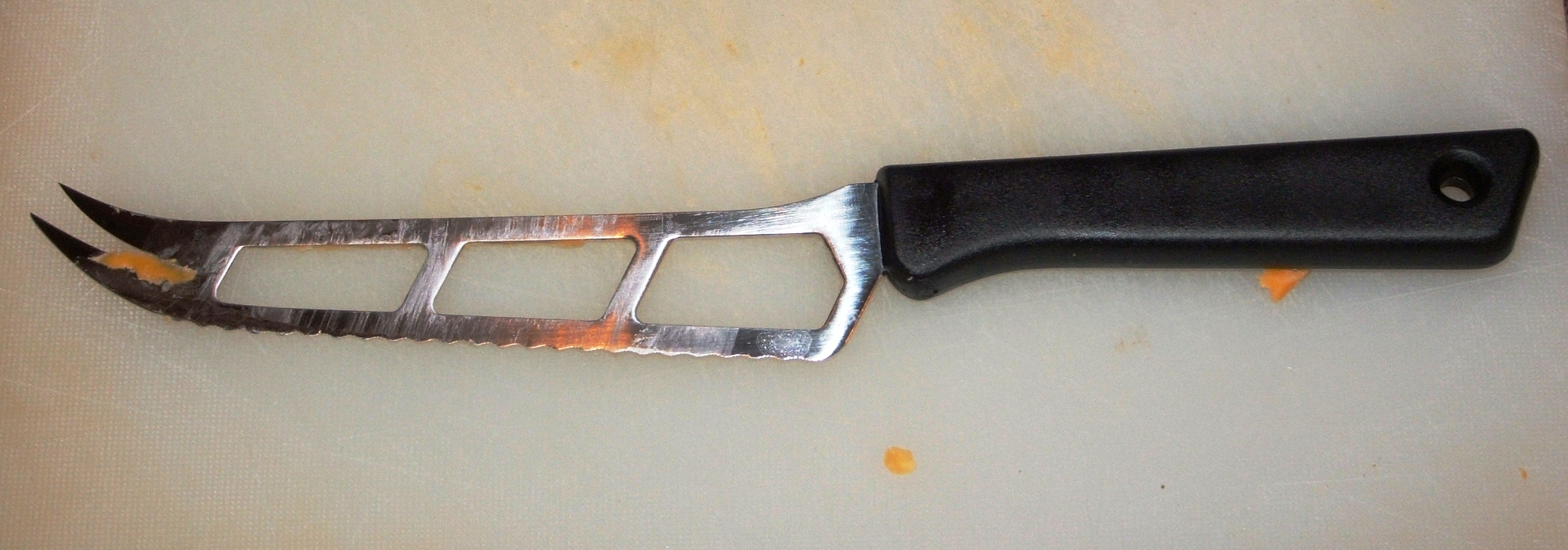
Soft cheese knife

A cheese knife is a type of kitchen knife specialized for the cutting of cheese. Different cheeses require different knives, according primarily to hardness. There are also a number of other kitchen tools designed for cutting or slicing cheese, especially the harder types. These include the cheese cutter, cheese slicer, cheese plane, cheese scoop for soft cheese and others, collectively known as cheese servers.

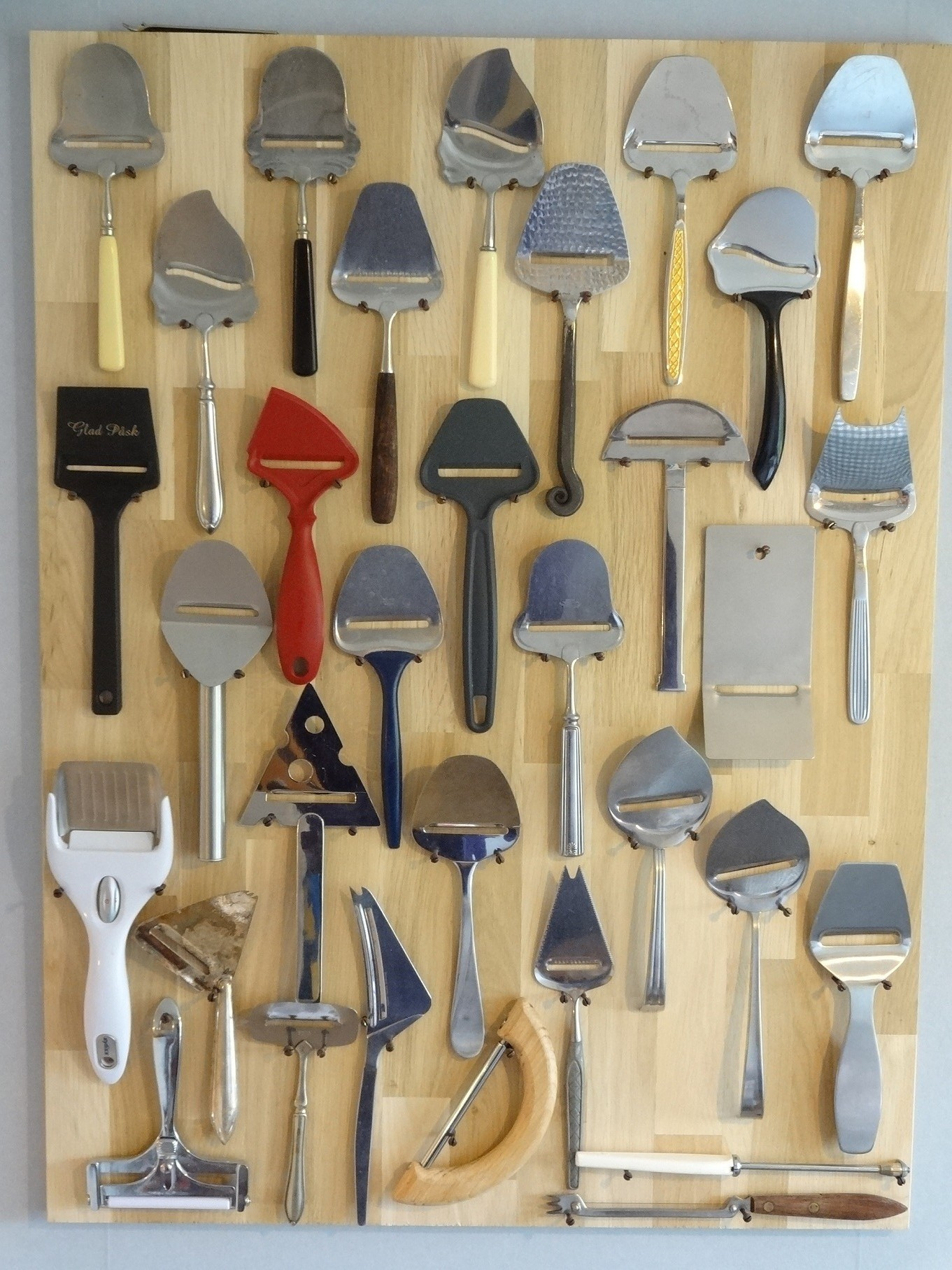
An assortment of cheese slicers

== Soft cheese knives ==
Soft cheese knives are designed to deal with the stickiness of soft cheese. When the cheese does not stick to the blade, it allows for pieces of cheese to be presented more attractively, with crisper shapes compared to cheese cut with standard knives.

The blades of cheese knives are usually made of a material such as stainless steel, which is resistant to the stickiness of cheese. Another design feature often found is the presence of holes in the blade to help to prevent the cheese from sticking to it. Some soft cheese knives also include a ridge, which runs vertically near the top of the blade. This helps separate the cheese as it is being sliced. Some cheese knives have a forked end, used for serving slices of cheese.

Most ordinary knives have a blade that is wide at the base and tapers to the tip. A cheese knife, on the other hand, may look similar to a cleaver in that it starts out thinner at the handle and then gets wider away from the base. Some cheese knives have angled handles to make an easier cut.

The non-sticky characteristics of a cheese knife also make them useful for cutting other sticky foods, such as cakes, eggs, and pies; compare also egg slicer.

== Hard cheese knives ==
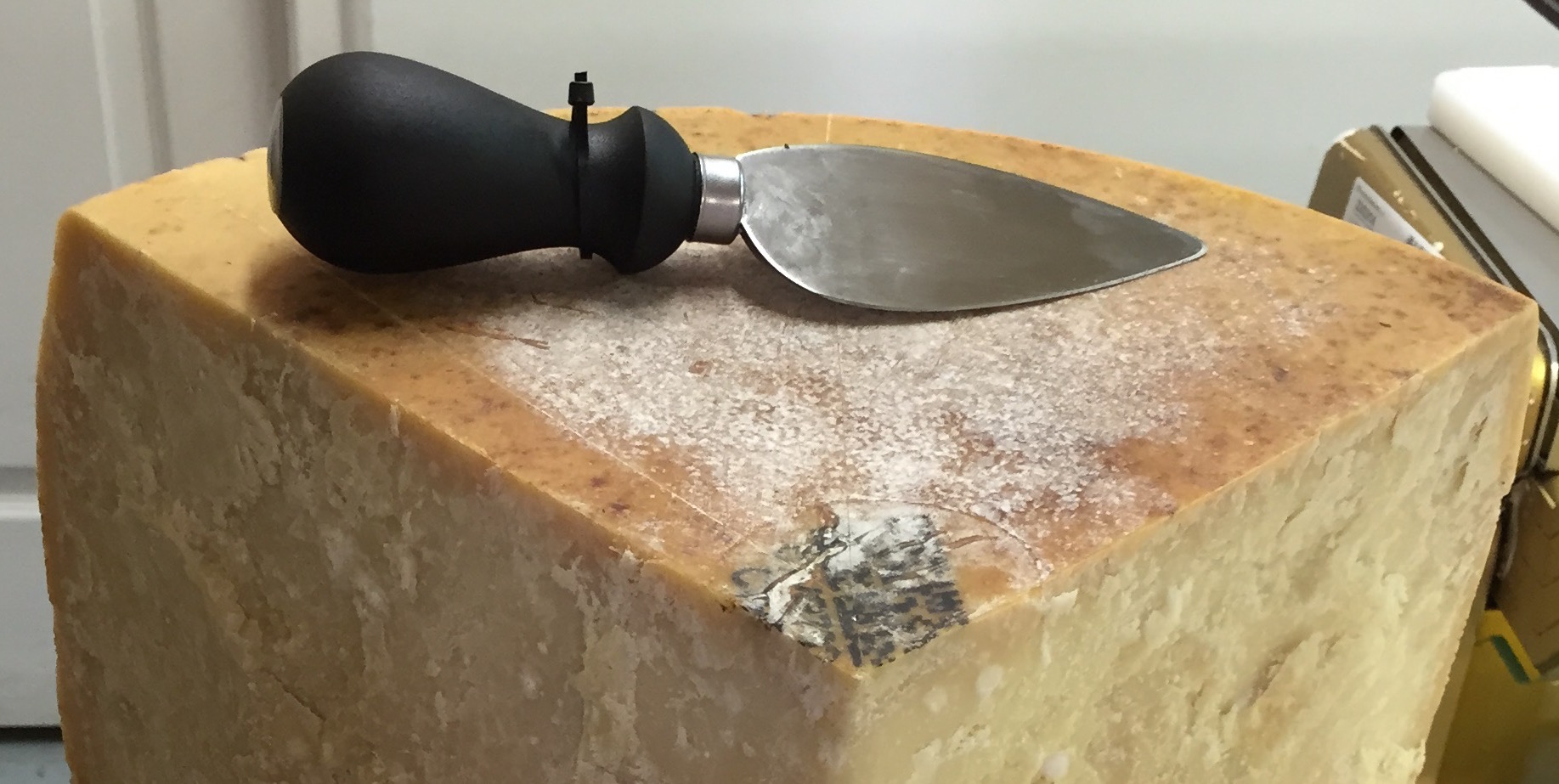
Parmesan cheese knife, featuring a short, stubby blade

Hard cheeses require a tough blade, which will not be damaged by the hard cheese. Exemplary is the distinctive Parmesan cheese knife, which is short, thick, and stubby, like an oyster knife.

Another popular design is that of a large off-set straight blade with handles on both ends - either parallel in line, but raised above, or at 90 degrees - so that a great amount of pressure may be applied.

== Alternatives ==
Various non-knife devices are used for cutting cheese, such as a cheese wire, which completely avoids adhesion, a cheese slicer, used primarily for thin slices of medium-hard cheeses, used especially in the Nordic countries and The Netherlands for cutting cheese for sandwiches, and the girolle, used to cut the hard Tête de Moine cheese by scraping.

=== Cheese slicer ===
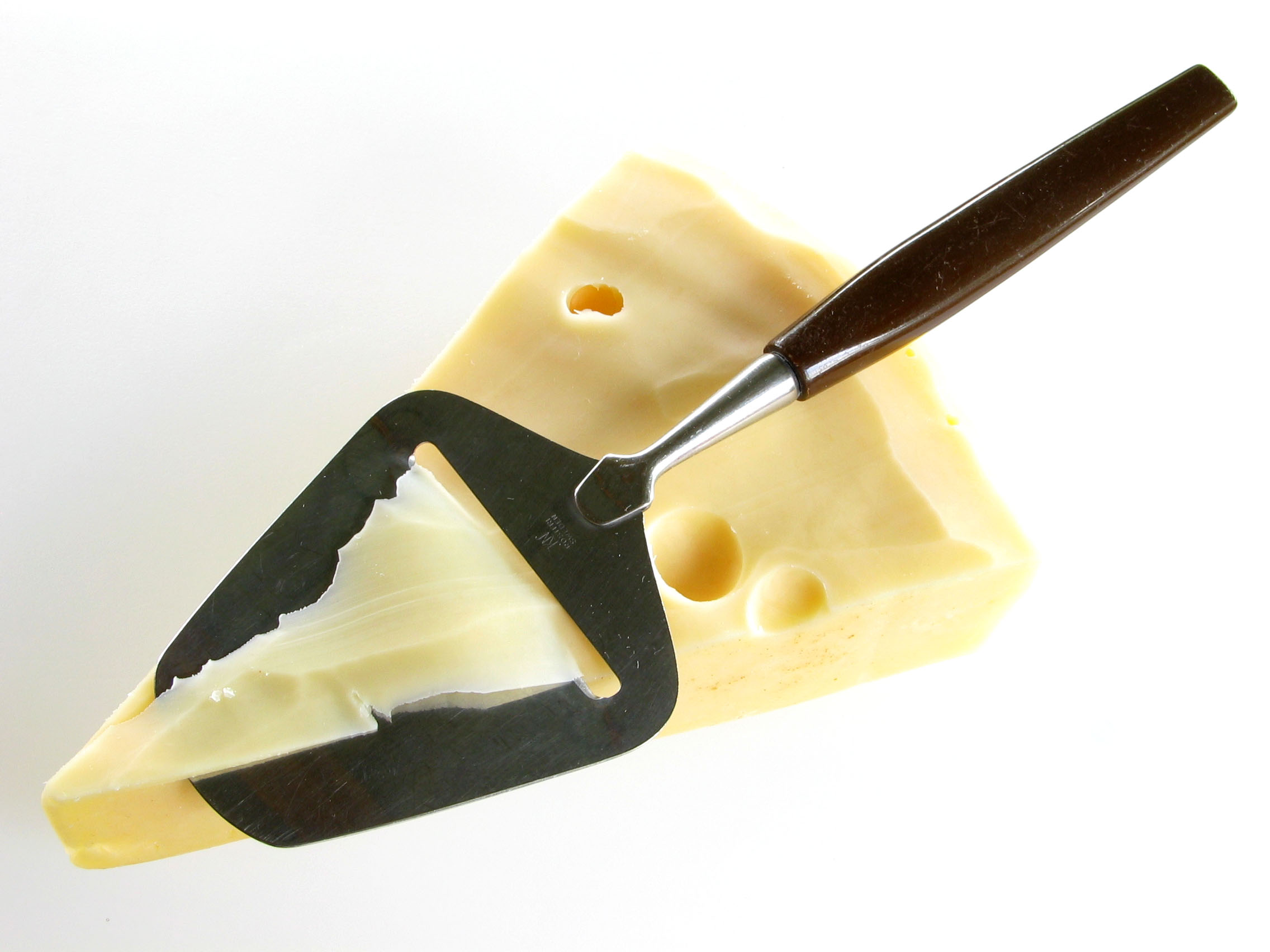
Ostehøvel

A cheese slicer is used usually to cut semi-hard and hard cheeses like Edam cheese. It produces thin, even slices. There are different styles of cheese slicers, designed for cheeses of varying hardness.

Ostehøvel, a modern cheese slicer or cheese plane, was invented by Thor Bjørklund in 1925 in Norway. Mass production of the ostehøvel started during 1927 in Lillehammer, Norway. He also tried to make a butter slicer (smørehøvel) built on the same general design, this idea was however scrapped after first prototype. The design was based on the carpenter's plane. This style of slicer is very common in the Nordic countries, and in the Netherlands, Belgium, Germany and Brazil.

=== Cheese cutter ===
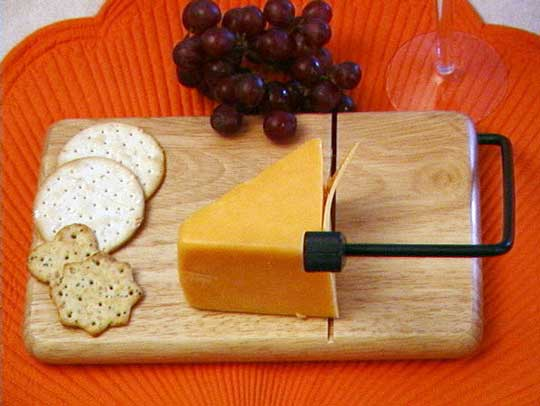
Cheese cutter, an alternative to the cheese knife

Cheese cutters are designed to cut soft, sticky cheeses (moist and oily), and accordingly do not have a large sharp-edged blade; compare to a cheese knife with holes in the blade. The cutting edge of cheese cutters are typically a fine gauge stainless steel or aluminium wire (a "cheesewire") stretched across a supporting frame. The thin wire cuts through a cheese block with hand pressure.

The original Prodyne Gourmet Cheese Slicer had a wooden board with a slot cut into it and a hole through which one end of a U-shaped steel cutting arm was inserted. In the patented design, a stainless steel wire extends between the two ends of the cutting arm fit into the slot, and cuts the cheese. The wire has loops at each end; one loop is around the steel cutting arm in the slot, while the other passes around a metal pin through a plastic handle on the other end of the cutting arm. The plastic handle rotates upward to tighten the wire, and is secured to the cutting arm with a screw.

The board-style cheese slicer has been expanded to include marble, stainless steel, and plastic cutting boards. Several other designs of handles and wire holders have also been invented to hold the cutting wires of cheese slicing boards. Many of these wires have loops on the ends like the Prodyne models; others have small rings or knots that fit into a slot on the handle and cutting arm.

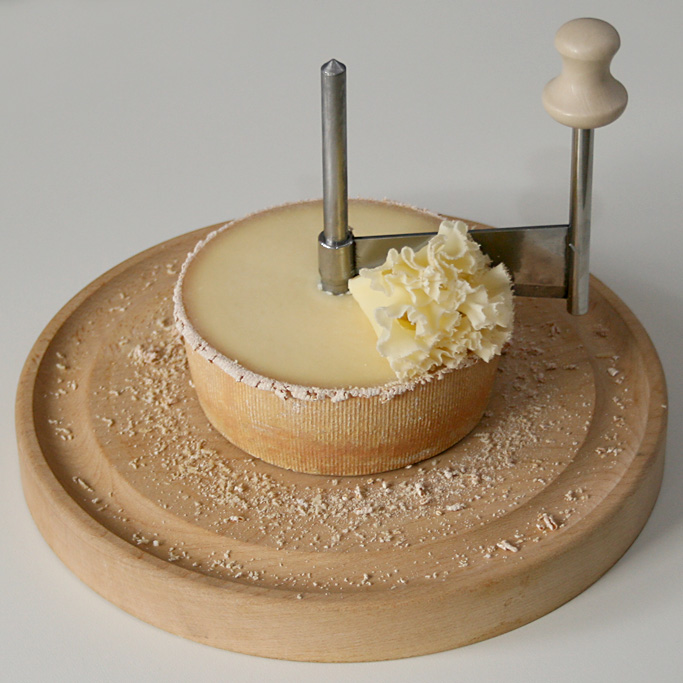
Girolle

=== Girolle ===
The girolle is a utensil for scraping Tête de Moine Swiss cheese into the form of rosettes that resemble chanterelle mushrooms (also known as girolle in French, hence the name of the device). This cheese was traditionally scraped with a knife. The girolle was invented in 1982 by Nicolas Crevoisier of the Swiss Jura and is produced by the Métafil-laGirolle company.

=== Cheese plane ===
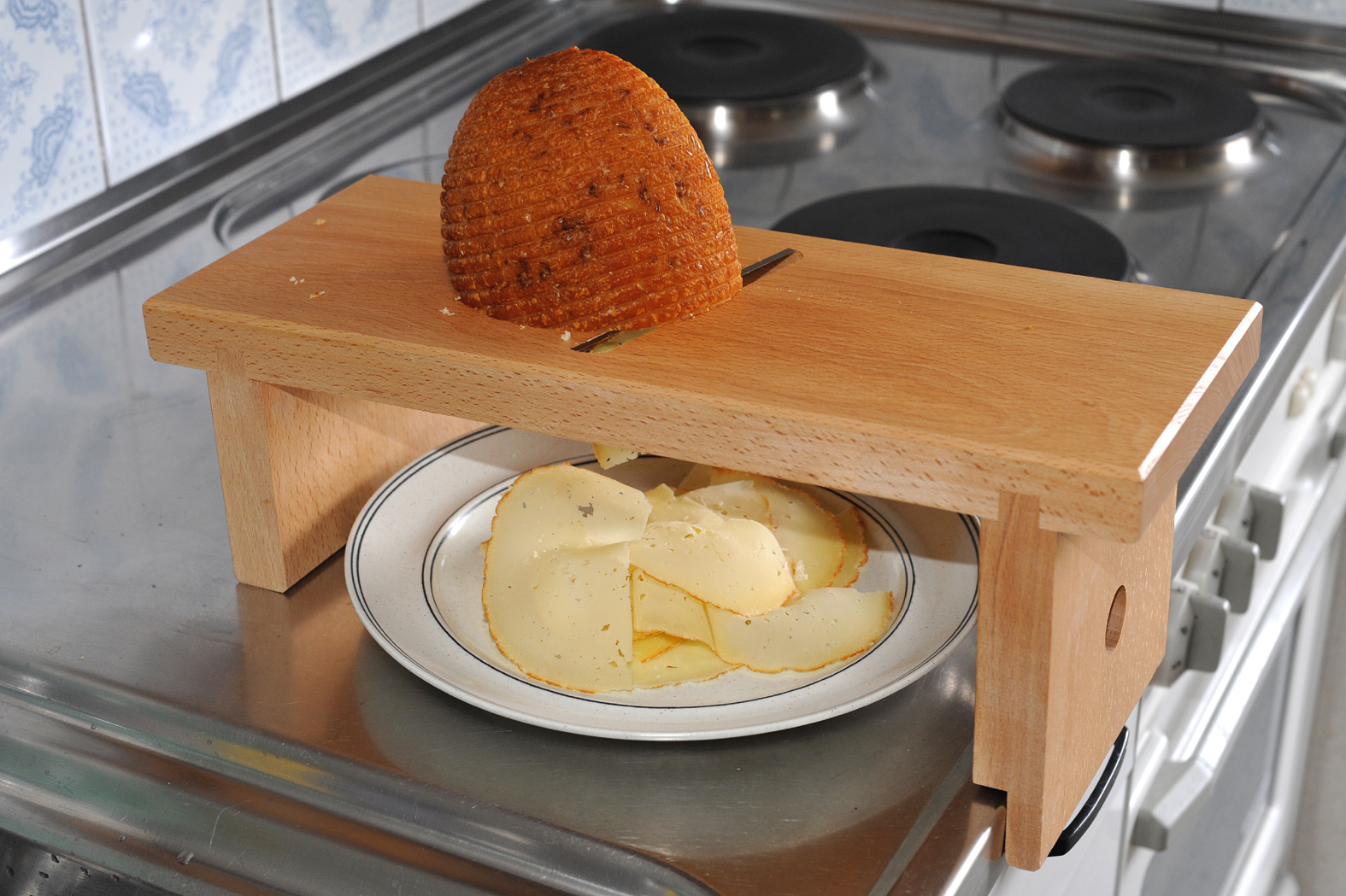
Cheese plane

The cheese plane is a stationary variant of a carpenter's plane, very similar to a kitchen mandolin slicer. It is used for cutting extra-hard Berner Alpkäse that has been aged for at least two years, also known as Hobelkäse (plane cheese).

=== Cheese scoop ===
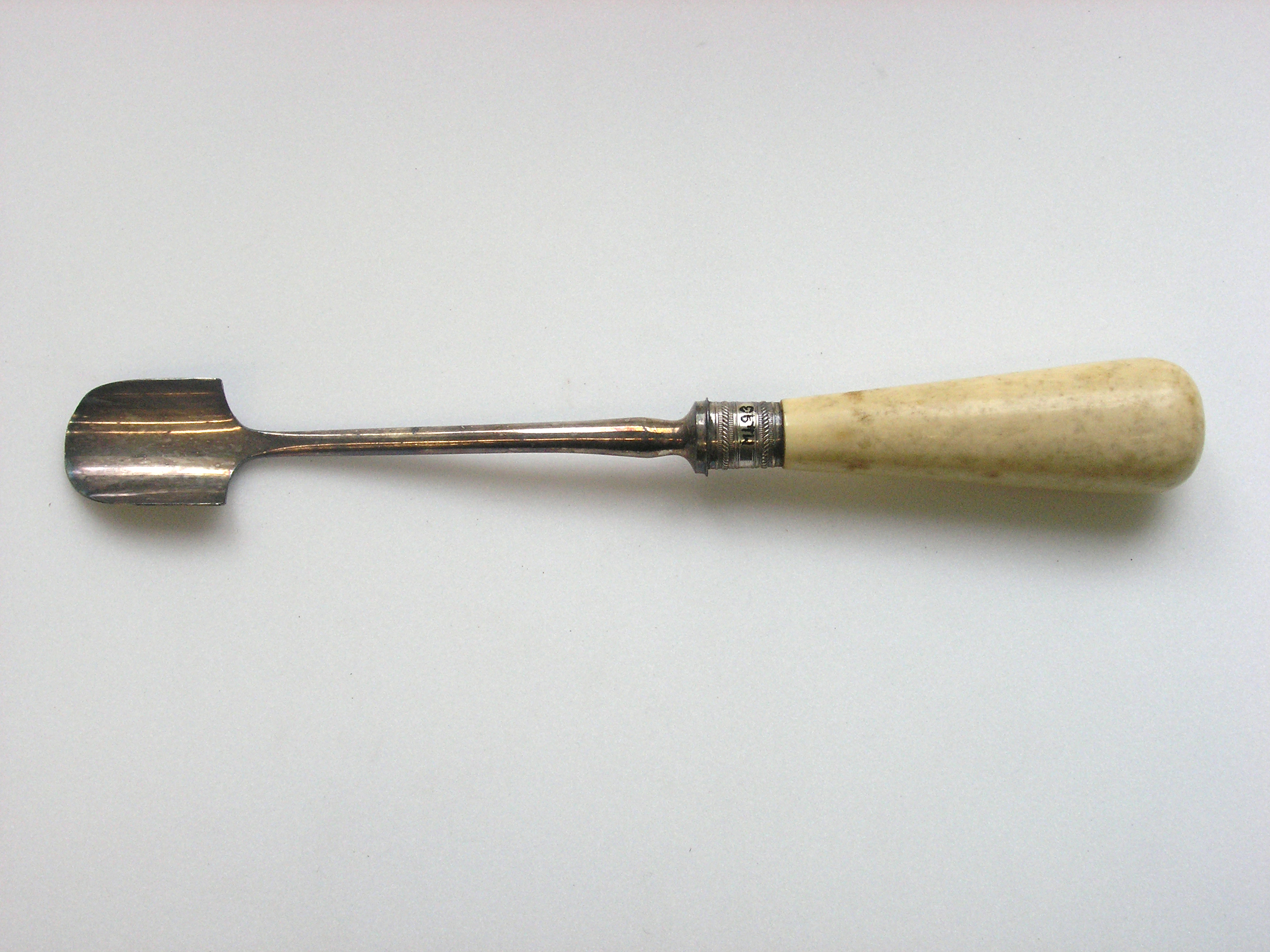
Cheese scoop (c. 1942)

The cheese scoop is used for softer or crumblier cheeses. It has a short curved blade with a long handle, creating an appearance of a tiny (6–8 inches or 15–20 cm long) garden trowel.

Particularly, it is used in a manner similar to both a spade for digging into the heavily veined central section of a medium-hard, but crumbly Stilton cheese truckle or wheel and then as a spoon for scooping the crumbled pieces - traditionally puddled with a splash or two of port, or a similar sweet fortified wine.

At a push, it can also be used to scoop out Gouda or Edam from their wax covers. The old version may have a built-in scraper, to push the cheese off the scoop, similar to the one in an ice cream scoop.
