= Reisfleisch =

Austrian dish

Reisfleisch (also referred to as Serbian Reisfleisch) is an Austrian dish that resembles Italian risotto. The dish is prepared using rice, as well as seared pieces of pork, veal, poultry or smoked bacon. Onions, garlic, salt, pepper and paprika powder can also be added. Reisfleisch is commonly served with grated Parmesan.

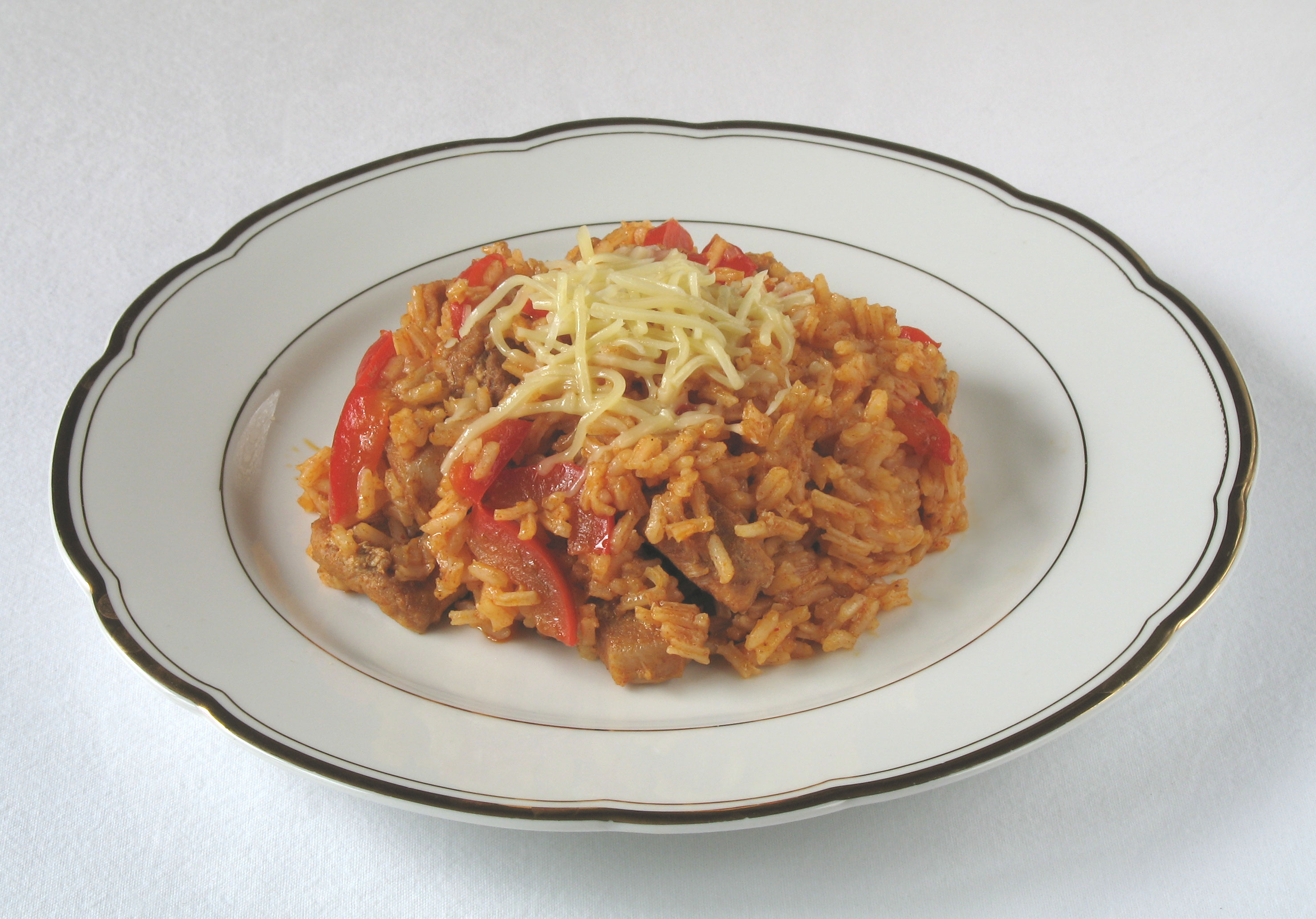
Reisfleisch served with grated Parmesan

The dish can be traced back to the year 1757, when it was mentioned in a handwritten cookbook under the name Faschirte Reiß Speiß (literally minced rice dish).
