= Raspadüra =

Method of serving grana cheese

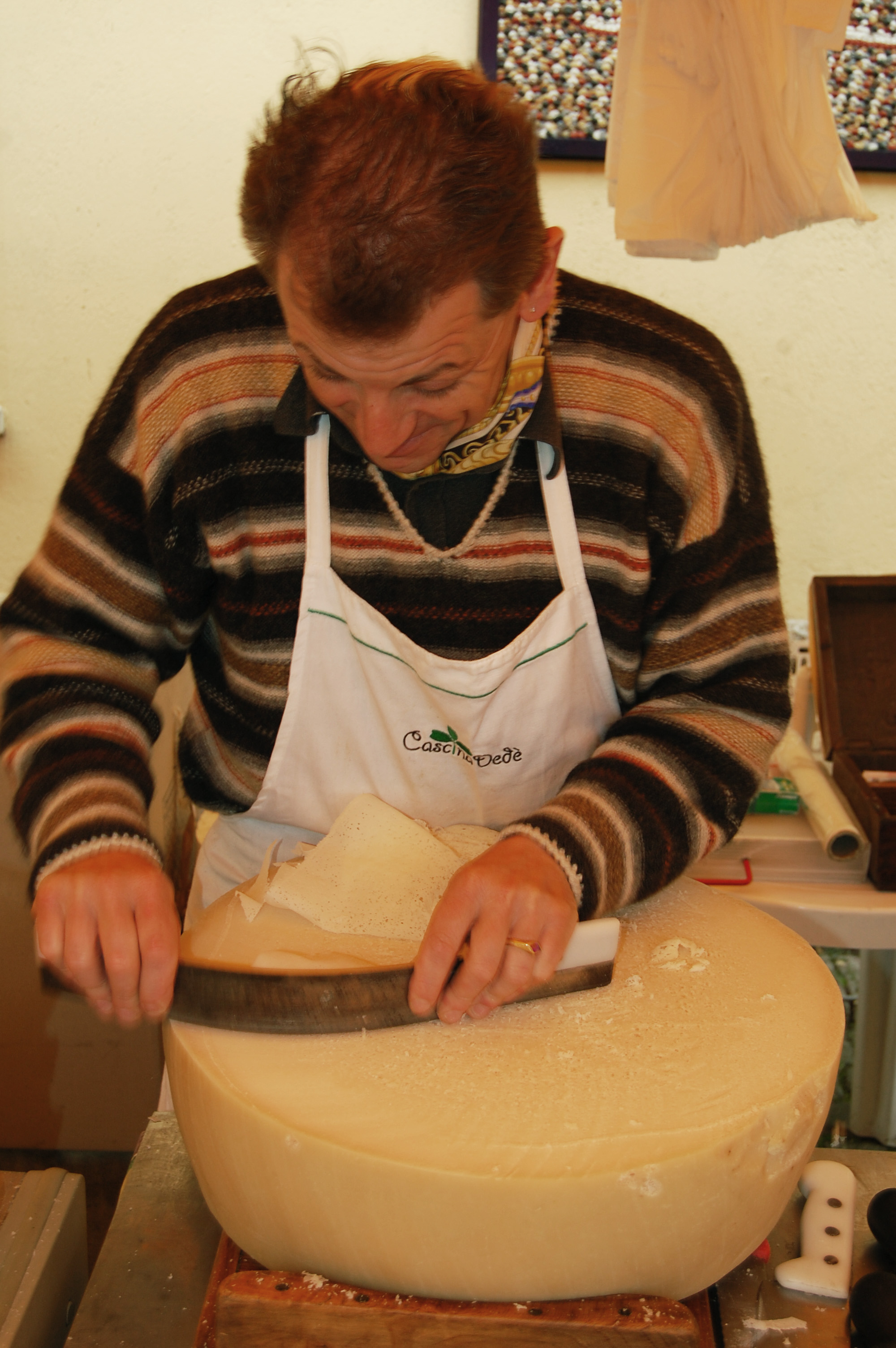
- Place of origin: Italy
- Region or state: Lombardy

Raspadüra is a way to serve grana cheese, presenting it as very thin sheets, scraped with a special knife from a wheel of Granone Lodigiano or from a "young" cheese of the grana family, that is aged from four to six months.

Raspadüra is typical of Lodi's gastronomy, but it is also spread in the neighboring territories of Pavia and Cremona provinces, where it keeps the same name. Raspadüra is usually served as an appetizer, often accompanied by cold cuts, nuts or mushrooms, but it can also be used to garnish first courses such as risotto or polenta.

Raspadüra was born as a poor food: in the past it was made from imperfect Granone Lodigiano cheese wheels, while today healthy wheels are used, aged enough to be cut without crumbling.

== History ==
Granone Lodigiano cheeses produced in the casere of the farmsteads, within the sixth month were checked for seasoning faults: they could present defects of compactness, cracks or internal bubbles, which could be felt by hammering the cheeses: then the cheesemaker discarded the defective cheeses, which were cut in half and sometimes given to the farmers of the farmstead, but more commonly taken to Lodi to be sold as raspadüra. Therefore, raspadüra was first a by-product of the processing of grana cheese, a low cost product for the poor who could not afford grated cheese, while now it is a dish also sought after by gourmets.

In many towns in the province of Lodi, on market days, it is still possible to watch the "raspada", the scraping of young grana cheeses (generally aged between 4 and 6 months), which is done on the spot at the customer's request.

== Etymology ==
Raspadüra is a term from the western Lombard language which in Italian means "scraping": the thin sheets of raspadüra are, in fact, progressively scraped from the surface of the half-cheese with the help of a manual lathe that turns the cheese on itself, and of a special flexible, flat and curved knife that in the colder months can also be heated, so as to obtain soft ribbons of grana cheese that curl up on themselves.
