= Giulio Bolognesi =

Italian-American diplomat

Count Giulio Bolognesi was an Italian-American diplomat and businessman. Bolognesi served as counsel general for Italy in Egypt, Argentina, Yugoslavia, Canada, and the United States. Appointed as counsel-general in Chicago in 1912, he served for 9 years, before serving in Yugoslavia for a year and then in Montreal Canada. He resigned from the diplomatic core in 1922 following the rise of Benito Mousilini. He returned to the United States, the home of his wife Rose who he'd married in 1916. During his time as counsel-general in Chicago, Bolognesi bought a farm in Wisconsin and is credited with helping bring to the US Parmesan cheese and helping more generally to spread Italian foods to the country. He became a U.S. citizen in 1940 and would become Vice President of a cheese company. He and Rose had two children.
