= Thor Bjørklund =

Norwegian inventor

- Born: 30 October 1889; Lillehammer, Oppland, Norway
- Died: 8 December 1975 (aged 86)
- Occupations: Inventor, businessman

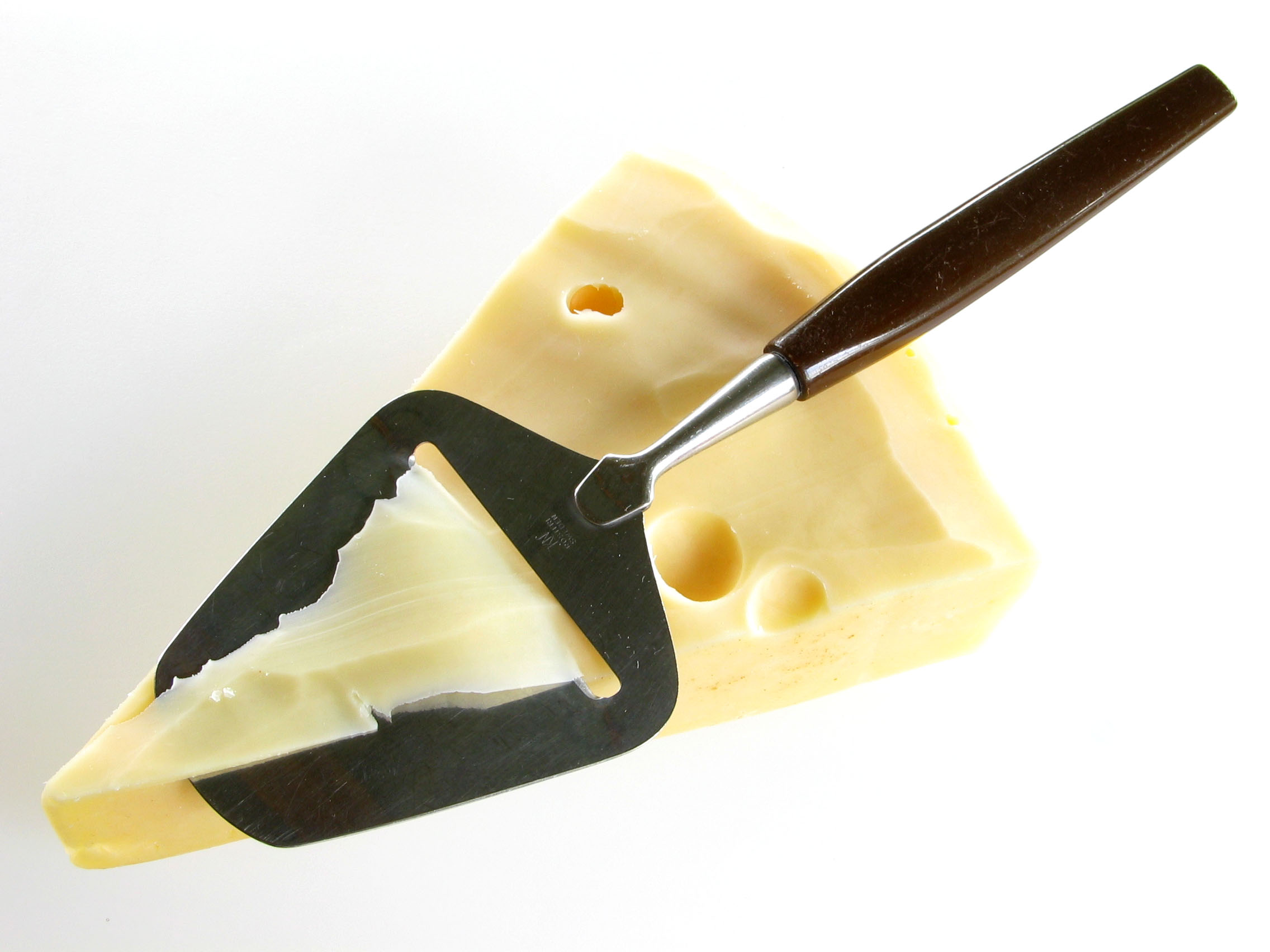
Ostehøvel

Thor Bjørklund (30 October 1889 – 8 December 1975) was a Norwegian inventor and businessman. He is best known as the inventor of the Ostehøvel, a popular cheese slicer which developed into an important Norwegian export product.

Thor Bjørklund was born in Lillehammer, Oppland, Norway. He was apprenticed as a cabinet maker. He also attended the Arts and Crafts School in Oslo. He was employed for some time as a master carpenter. He began to experiment with a carpenter's plane in the hope that he could create something similar for use in the kitchen. He made cheese slicers in his workshop, and on 27 February 1925 he patented the model of cheese slicer which is today found in many households in Nordic countries. and also particularly in the Netherlands.

In 1927, he started the firm known today as Thor Bjørklund & Sønner AS. The company still produces cheese slicers in Lillehammer, and has operated since 17 November 2009 as a subsidiary of Gudbrandsdal Industrier AS.
