= Grana (cheese) =

Hard Italian cheese

Grana is a family of hard, mature cheese from Italy with a granular texture, often used for grating. Grana cheeses are typically made in the form of large wheels. The structure is often described as crystalline, and the wheels are divided by being split with a fairly blunt almond-shaped knife designed for the purpose, rather than being sliced, cut or sawn. Within the European Union the term grana is legally protected by Grana Padano protected designation of origin (PDO); Only Grana Padano may be sold using the term in EU countries.

The two best-known examples of grana-type cheeses are Parmesan and Grana Padano. The two cheeses are broadly similar, with the latter being less sharp, crumbly and grainy.

The main difference between the two is that cows producing Parmesan eat only grass and cereals—no silage, no preservatives, and no antibiotics. Cows that have been treated with antibiotics are suspended from production of Parmesan and Grana Padano. Silage is a fermented forage that requires the addition of a natural preservative (lysozyme) to Grana Padano. Feeding of silage and addition of lysozyme are forbidden in production of Trentingrana and Parmesan.

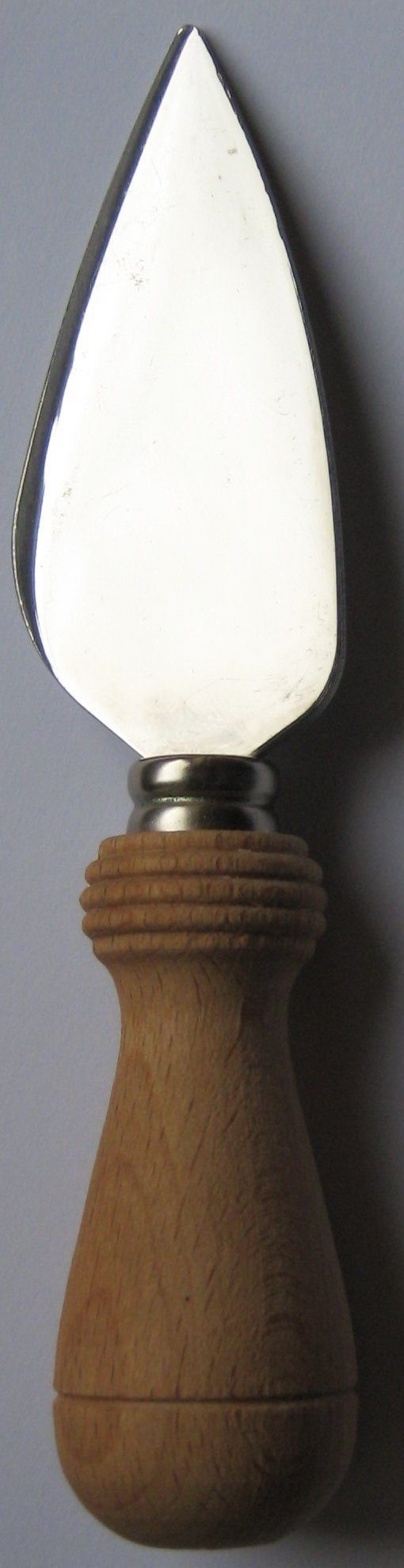
A tagliagrana (Parmesan knife)

Other grana cheeses include:

- Granone Lodigiano (also called "Tipico Lodigiano"), produced in the province of Lodi
- Trentingrana, produced in and around Trento
- Gran Sardo, a sheep's milk cheese from Sardinia
- Valgrana, from Piedmont
- Gran Moravia, produced in Czechia

Grana cheeses typically contain cheese crystals, semi-solid to gritty crystalline spots that at least partially consists of the amino acid tyrosine.

== History ==
Grana originally described a type of hard cheese from the Po Valley (Val Padana), in northern Italy, with a distinctive granular texture—the word grana in Italian means 'grain'.

== See also ==
- Grana Padano
- Parmesan knife

== Sources ==
- Rubino, R., Sardo, P., Surrusca, A. (2005), Italian Cheese. ISBN 88-8499-111-0.
