= Cheese crystals =

Aggregates which can form on cheese

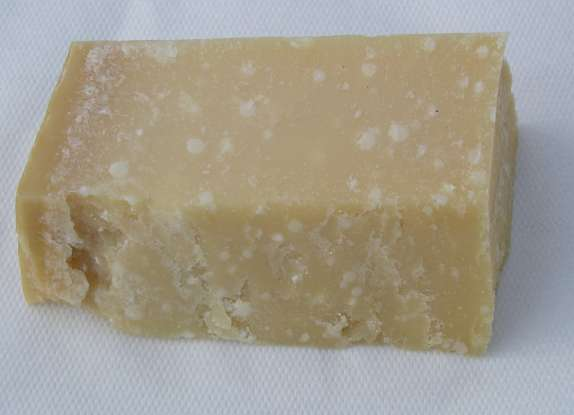
A piece of aged Parmesan containing typical white spots of cheese crystals on the cut surface

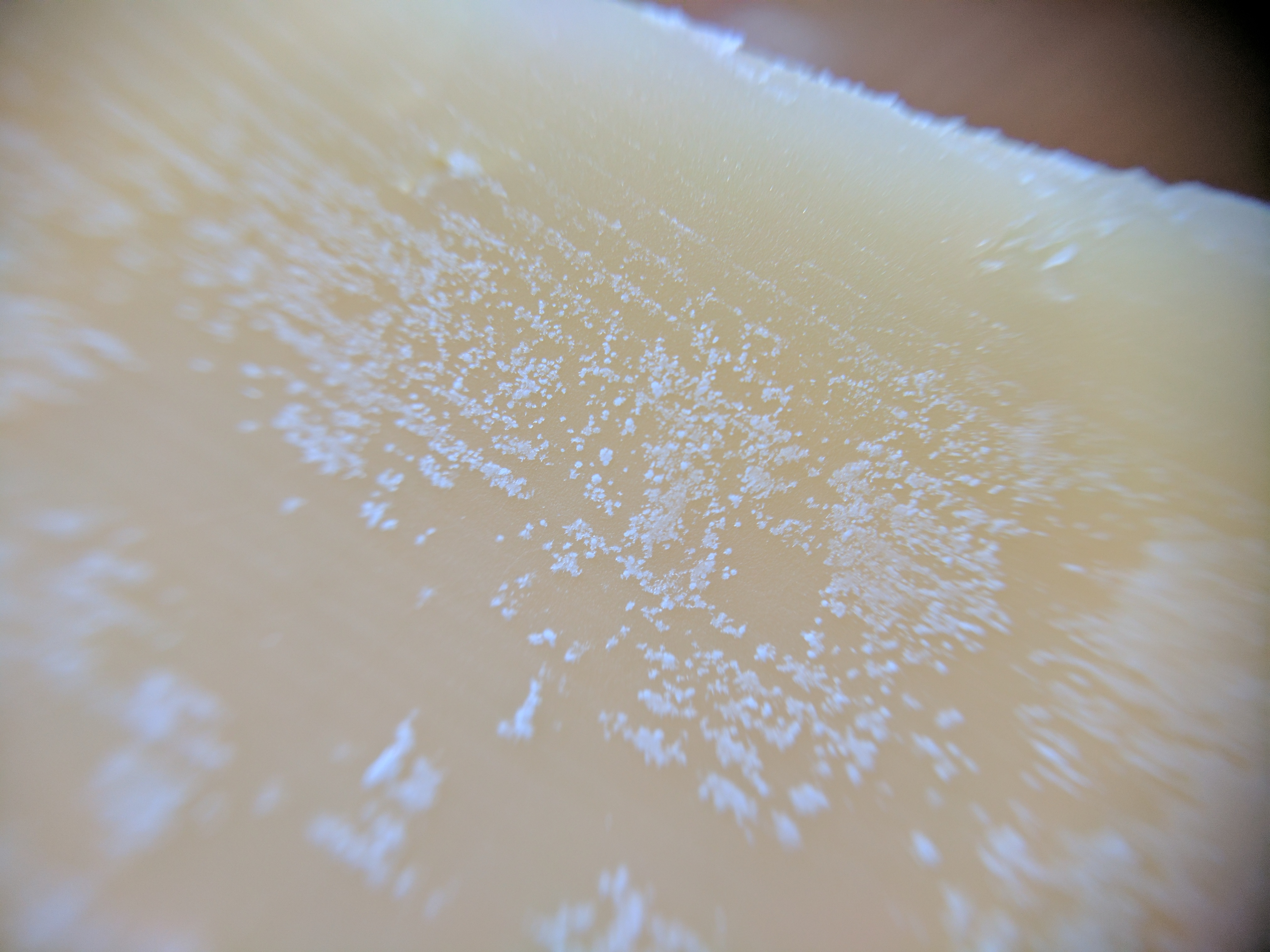
Close-up of cheese crystals on old Gouda

Cheese crystals are whitish, semi-solid to solid, slightly crunchy to gritty crystalline spots, granules, and aggregates that can form on the surface and inside of cheese. Cheese crystals are characteristic of many long-aged hard cheeses.

Hard cheeses where cheese crystals are common and valued include comté, aged cheddar, grana cheeses like Parmesan, Grana Padano, and pecorino romano, as well as old gouda. However, in some cheeses, like industrial cheddar, they are considered a production defect.

Cheese crystals can consist of different substances. Most commonly found are calcium lactate crystals, especially on younger cheese, on the surface, and on cheddar. Depending on the cheese and its age, these crystals can consist of either or both enantiomers. For grana padano, grainy amino acid crystals inside the cheese consisting mainly of tyrosine and of leucine and isoleucine have been reported. In general, any substance that has a low solubility in water and a tendency to crystallize could form crystals as the cheese dries out during aging.
