= King of cheeses =

Informal title for a variety of cheese

Various cheeses have been called the king, queen, or prince of cheeses. The title is informal and lacks standardization, sometimes with multiple kings in one country.

== By country ==
Britain
Stilton (1912)
Cheddar
France
Brie de Meaux: at the Congress of Vienna (1814), it was originally declared Prince des fromages, et premier des desserts 'Prince of cheeses, and first among desserts', which later became "king of cheeses, cheese of kings". It is also called the "queen of cheeses".
Roquefort: Frédéric Leblanc du Vernet, 1869
Époisses: Brillat-Savarin, early 19th century
Italy
Parmigiano Reggiano
Sweden
Västerbotten, king of Swedish cheeses
Switzerland
Emmental, king of Swiss cheeses

== By type ==
Cheeses are idiosyncratically named kings of particular types of cheese by individual writers:

Maroilles (France), the king of strong cheeses;
Halloumi (Cyprus), the king of cooking cheeses.

== Ranks of nobility ==
Sometimes other royal ranks are used:

Brie, the queen of cheeses;
Camembert, the prince of cheeses.
