= Parmesan knife =

Knife used to cut hard cheese

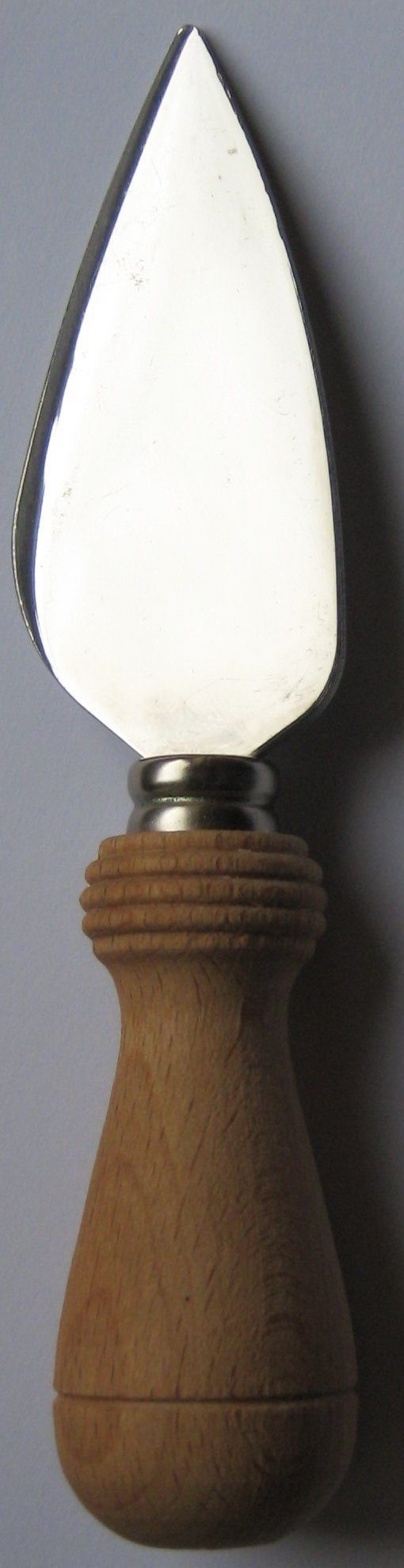
A grana knife (tagliagrana)

The Parmesan knife or grana knife, known in Italian as tagliagrana, is a knife with a teardrop-shaped blade and a round wooden handle, used to break hard cheeses such as Parmesan and grana into shards. Bigger knives with a flat handle that can be hammered are used to cut open the cheese wheels, the crusts of which are rather hard.

== See also ==
- Parmesan
- Grana
