= Grana Padano =

Italian cheese

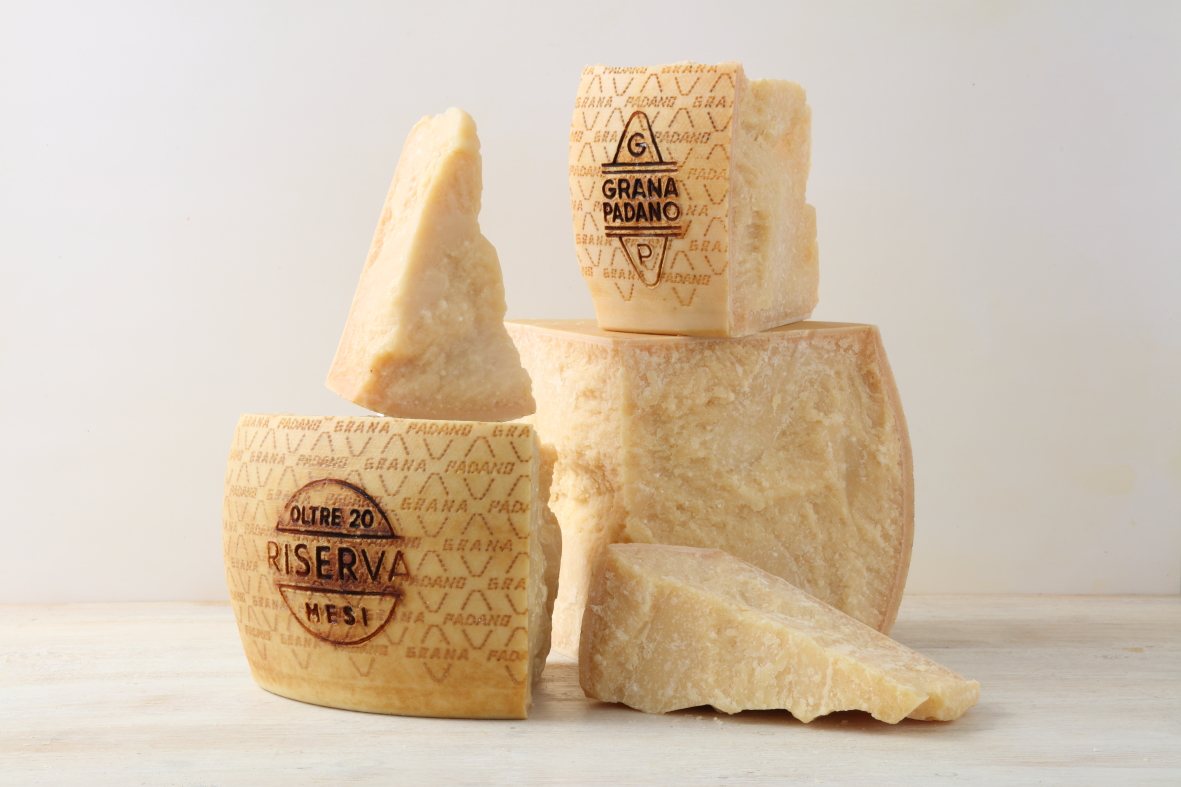
- Country of origin: Italy
- Source of milk: Cows
- Pasteurised: No
- Texture: Hard
- Aging time: 8–20 months
- Certification: Italy: DOC: 1955; EU: PDO: 1996

Grana Padano is an Italian cheese originating in the Po Valley. It is similar to Parmesan but with less strict regulations governing its production. This hard, crumbly-textured cheese is made with unpasteurized cows' milk that is semi-skimmed. To preserve the authenticity of the manufacturing processes and raw materials used to make this cheese, Grana Padano was registered as a denominazione di origine controllata (DOC) in 1955, and as a European Union protected designation of origin (PDO) in 1996. (Note: Grana Padano is the most produced cheese under the protected designation of origin-scheme.) Outside of the EU, its name is protected in several other countries on the basis of the Lisbon Agreement and bilateral agreements.

== Etymology ==
Grana Padano logo

The Italian word grana refers to its grainy texture, and the demonym padano means 'from Val Padana' (the Po Valley).

== History ==
Grana Padano was developed by monks of Chiaravalle Abbey in the 12th century. It can last a long time without spoiling, and is sometimes aged for up to two years. It is made in a similar way to the Parmesan of Emilia-Romagna, but over a much wider area and with different regulations and controls.

It has been traditionally produced in a number of territories throughout the Po Valley, including in Piedmont, Lombardy (excluding parts of Mantua), Veneto (excluding the province of Belluno), Trento, parts of Emilia-Romagna, and some municipalities within the South Tyrol.

In 2017, Grana Padano was the second highest-value PDO food produced in Italy (behind Parmigiano Reggiano), with annual production value of 1.293 billion euros. By 2024, it had overtaken Parmigiano Reggiano to be the most produced PDO food in Italy; total production value was 2.185 billion EUR.

== Production process ==
Like Parmesan, Grana Padano is a semi-fat hard cheese which is cooked and ripened slowly for at least nine months. If it passes quality tests, it is fire-branded with the Grana Padano trademark. The cows are milked twice a day. Milk produced in the evening is skimmed to remove the surface layer of cream and mixed with fresh milk produced in the morning. The partly skimmed milk is transferred into copper kettles and coagulated; the resulting curd is cut to produce granules with the size of rice grains, which gives the cheese its characteristic texture, and then warmed to 53–56 °C (127–133 °F). It is produced year-round, and varies seasonally as well as by year. Although similar to Parmesan cheese, the younger Grana Padano cheeses are less crumbly, milder, and less complex in flavour than the better-known, longer-aged Parmesan.

It is produced via lactic acid fermentation and a long, slow ripening process lasting 14-16 months. The addition of non-starter lactic acid bacteria is affected by the production process, and in turn affect the resulting microbiota that gives the cheese its typical characteristics. The production process differs from that of Parmesan in that cattle producing the milk may be fed high-quality silage. This "favors the contamination of raw milk by spore-forming clostridia". Lysozyme is added to the vats to prevent late blowing (swelling during the ripening process) that may result from butyric fermentation, and is an anti-clostridial agent.

About 150 factories make Grana Padano in the Po Valley area, and an estimated 76,724 tons of this cheese are manufactured annually. About 14.4 kilograms (32 lb) of milk yield 1 kilogram (2.2 lb) of cheese.

== Specifications ==
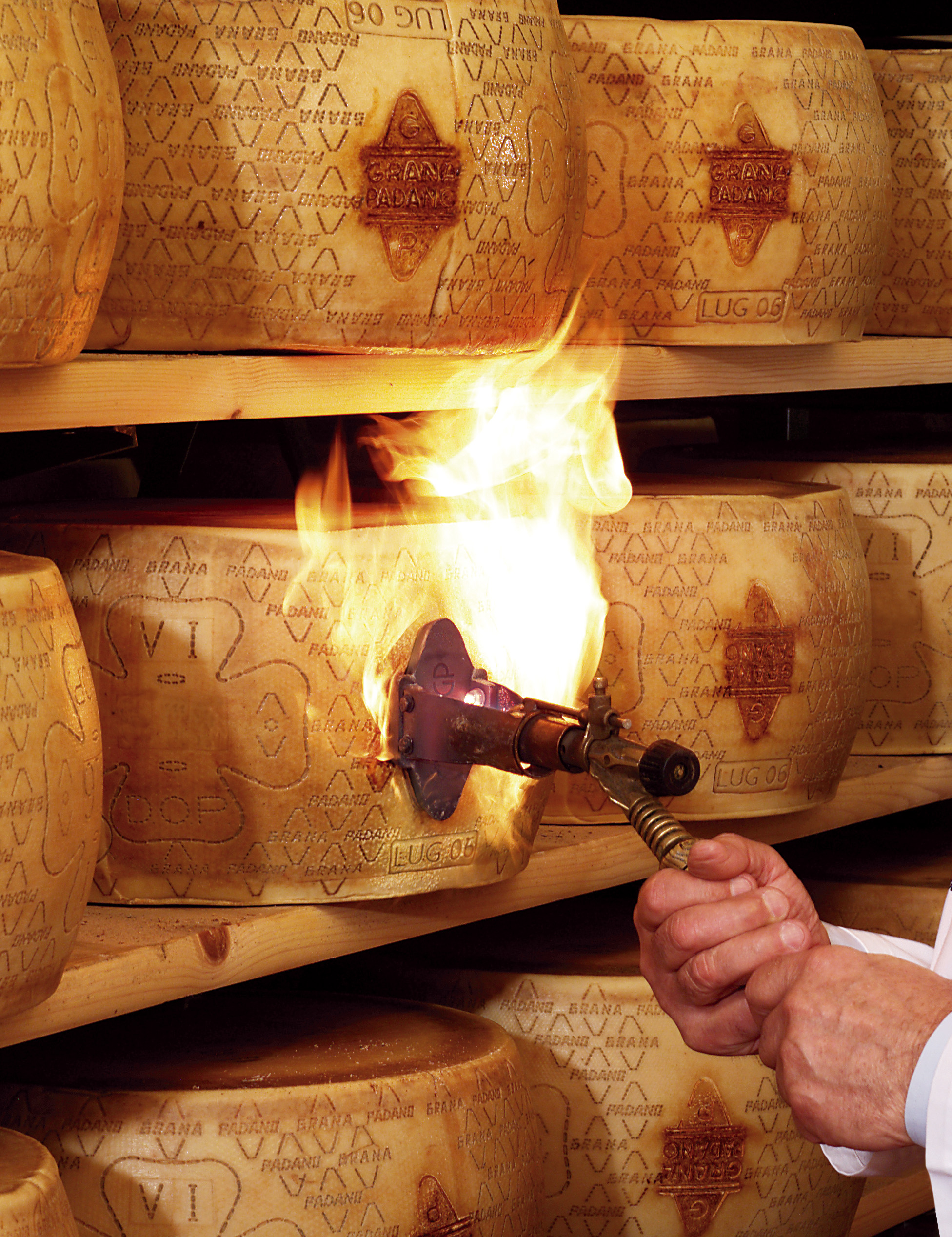
After nine months of aging, each wheel gets checked and, if considered of adequate quality, gets fire-branded with the Grana Padano logo.

A wheel of Grana Padano is cylindrical, with slightly convex or almost straight sides and flat faces. It is 35 to 45 cm (14 to 18 in) in diameter, and 15 to 18 cm (5.9 to 7.1 in) high. It weighs 24 to 40 kg (53 to 88 lbs) per wheel. The rind, which is thin, is pale yellow.

Grana Padano is sold in three different ripening stages:

- "Grana Padano" (9 to 16 months): texture still creamy, only slightly grainy;
- "Grana Padano oltre 16 mesi" (over 16 months): crumblier texture, more pronounced taste;
- "Grana Padano Riserva" (over 20 months): grainy, crumbly, and full-flavoured.

== Nutritional value and calories ==
1.5 litres of fresh, naturally partially-skimmed cows' milk from the production area, are needed to make 100 g of Grana Padano PDO cheese. The Grana Padano processing and ageing procedures determine an important bioavailability of vitamins and minerals, the supply of proteins with nine essential amino acids and make it a highly digestible product. In addition, Grana Padano is nearly lactose-free due to the characteristics of its production and ageing process, which also leads to a reduction of lipids. It contains a galactose content of less than 10 mg per 100 g.

The Grana Padano PDO Production Specifications regulate the entire production chain, from the cows' fodder to the branding of the wheels, therefore the average nutritional value and calories of Grana Padano PDO cheese remain stable and any variation in them is irrelevant for the purpose of defining a balanced diet.

Below is the nutritional table for a medium portion of 100 grams of Grana Padano:

Main nutrients
Water	32 g
Calories	398 kcal
Total proteins	33 g
Total amino acids	6 g
Fat	29 g
Fiber	0 g
Ashes	4.6 g
Carbohydrates
Sugar (Carbohydrates)	<1 g
Minerals
Calcium	1165.0 mg
Phosphorus	692.0 mg
Potassium	120 mg
Magnesium	63 mg
Zinc	11 mg
Copper	0.5 mg
Iron	0.14 mg
Calcium / phosphorus ratio	1.7
Salt	1.5 g
Iodine	35.5 μg
Selenium	12 μg
Vitamins
Vitamin A	224 μg
Vitamin B1	20 μg
Vitamin B2	0.36 mg
Vitamin B3	3.0 μg
Vitamin B6	0.12 mg
Vitamin B12	3.0 μg
Vitamin D3	0.5 μg
Vitamin E	206 μg
Pantothenic acid	246 μg
Choline	20.0 mg
Biotin	6.0 μg
Lipids
Saturated fat	18.4 g
Monounsaturated fat	7.4 g
Polyunsaturated fat	1.1 g
Cholesterol	98.3 mg

== See also ==
- List of Italian cheeses
- Grana
