= Parmesan =

Italian hard cheese

Parmigiano Reggiano
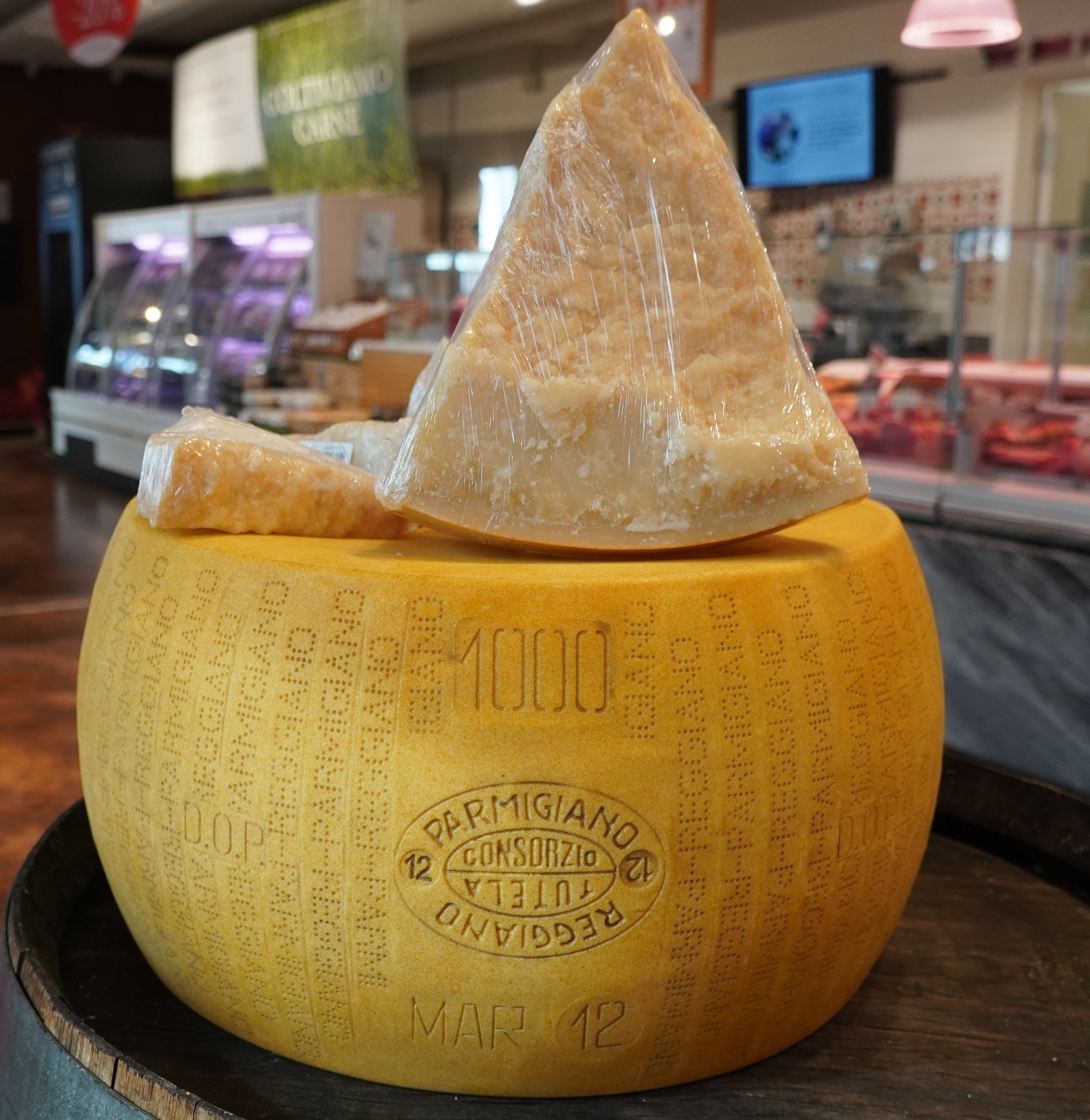
- Other names: Parmigiano Reggiano (in Italian)
- Country of origin: Italy
- Region: Emilia-Romagna
- Town: Provinces of Parma, Reggio Emilia, Modena, Bologna (west of the River Reno) and Mantua (on the right/south bank of the River Po)
- Source of milk: Cows (mostly Friesian and Reggiana cattle)
- Pasteurised: No
- Texture: Hard
- Aging time: Minimum: 12 months Vecchio: 18–24 months Stravecchio: 24–36 months
- Certification: Italy: DOP: 1955; EU: PDO: 1992

Parmesan (Italian: Parmigiano Reggiano, pronounced [parmiˈdʒaːno redˈdʒaːno]) is an Italian hard, granular cheese produced from cow's milk and aged at least 12 months. It is a grana-type cheese, along with Grana Padano, the historic Granone Lodigiano, and others.

The term Parmesan may refer to either Parmigiano Reggiano or, when outside the European Union and Lisbon Agreement countries, a locally produced imitation.

Parmigiano Reggiano is named after two of the areas which produce it, the Italian provinces of Parma and Reggio Emilia (Parmigiano is the Italian adjective for the city and province of Parma and Reggiano is the adjective for the province of Reggio Emilia); it is also produced in the part of Bologna west of the River Reno and in Modena (all of the above being located in the Emilia-Romagna region), as well as in the part of Mantua (Lombardy) on the south bank of the River Po.

The names Parmigiano Reggiano and Parmesan are protected designations of origin (PDO) for cheeses produced in these provinces under Italian and European law. Outside the EU, the name Parmesan is legally used for imitations, with only the full Italian name unambiguously referring to PDO Parmigiano Reggiano. A 2021 press release by the Italian farmer-rancher association Coldiretti reported that, in the United States, 90% of "Italian sounding" cheese sold as parmesan, mozzarella, grana, and gorgonzola was produced domestically.

Parmigiano Reggiano, among others, has been called "king of cheeses".

== Definitions ==
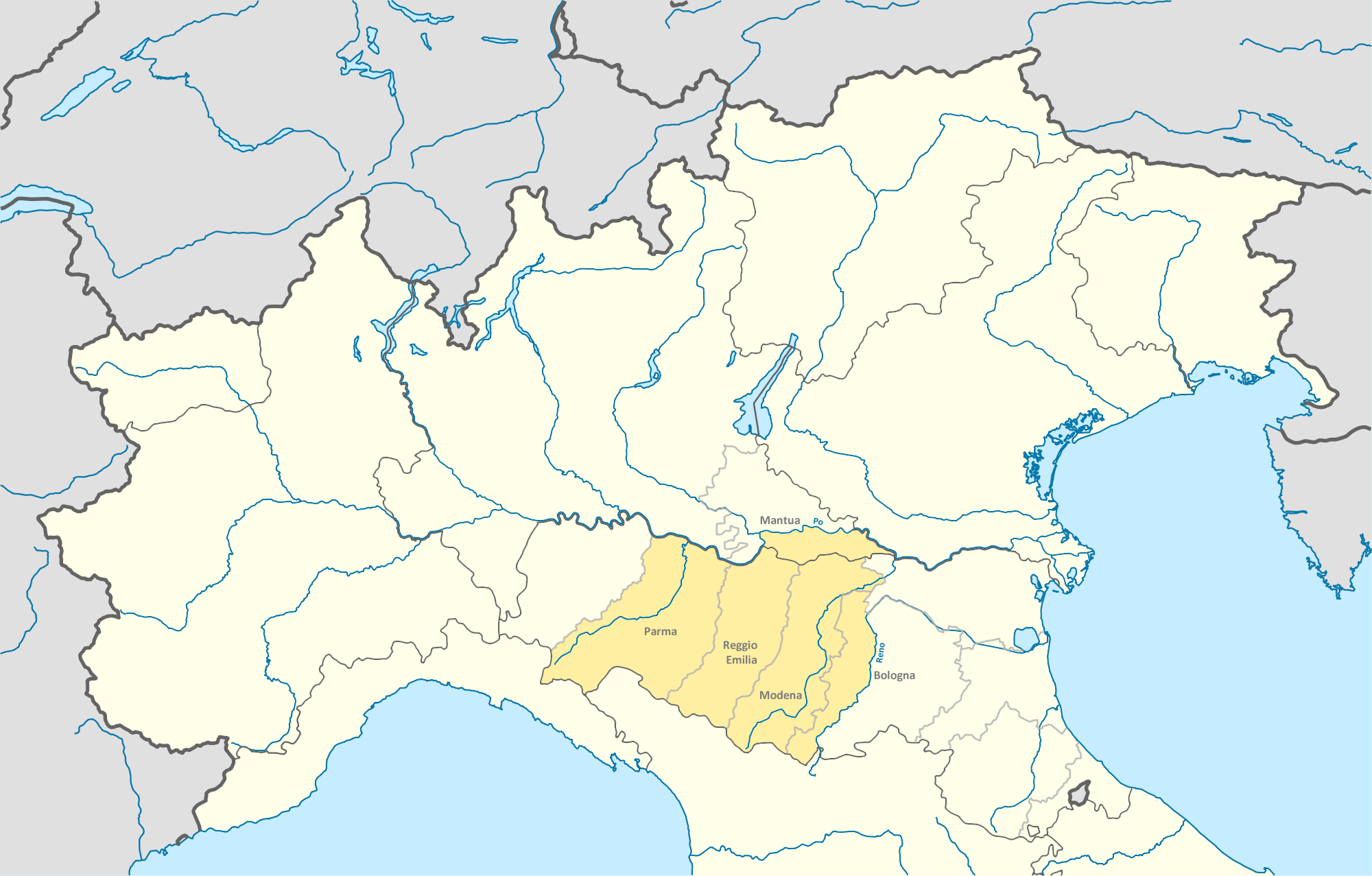
The production region of PDO Parmigiano Reggiano

Official logo of PDO Parmigiano Reggiano

The name Parmigiano is legally protected in the European Union and, in Italy, exclusive control is exercised over the cheese's production and sale by The Consortium of Parmigiano Reggiano, which was created by a governmental decree. Each wheel must meet strict criteria early in the aging process, when the cheese is still soft and creamy, to merit the official seal and be placed in storage for aging.

Because it is widely imitated, Parmigiano Reggiano has become an increasingly regulated product, and in 1955 it became what is known as a certified name (which is not the same as a brand name). In 2008, an EU court determined that the name Parmesan in Europe only refers to Parmigiano Reggiano and cannot be used for imitation Parmesan. Thus, in the European Union, Parmigiano Reggiano is a protected designation of origin (PDO); legally, the name refers exclusively to the Parmigiano Reggiano PDO cheese manufactured in a limited area in northern Italy.

Special seals identify the product as authentic, with the identification number of the dairy, the production month and year, a code identifying the individual wheel, and stamps regarding the length of aging.

== Name ==
The English name parmesan is borrowed from French parmesan, earlier parmisan, in turn borrowed from Italian parmigiano. In French, it is first attested as a name for the cheese in 1414, and in English, in 1519. The regular English pronunciation is /ˈpɑːrməzɑːn/ but in US English it is often pronounced as the "hyper-French" /ˈpɑːrməʒɑːn/, using the French /ʒ/ sound (not used in this word in French) to represent the Italian sound /dʒ/.

== Industry ==
All producers of Parmigiano Reggiano belong to the Consorzio del Formaggio Parmigiano Reggiano (lit. 'Parmigiano Reggiano Cheese Consortium'), which was founded in 1928. Besides setting and enforcing the standards for the PDO, the Consorzio also sponsors marketing activities.

As of 2017, about 3.6 million wheels (approx. 137,000 metric tons) of Parmesan are produced every year; they use about 18% of all the milk produced in Italy.

In 2015, 60 percent of the workers in the Parmesan industry were immigrants from India, almost all Sikhs. Their work is considered fundamental to maintaining traditional Parmesan production by locals, although there is a recent resurgence in native Italian interest in working for the Parmesan industry. According to ISMEA - Qualivita, an annual study of PDO/PGI/TSG foods produced in Italy, Parmigiano Reggiano was the second most produced PDO food in Italy by value after Grana Padano. Total production in 2025 was worth €1.760 billion.

== Production ==
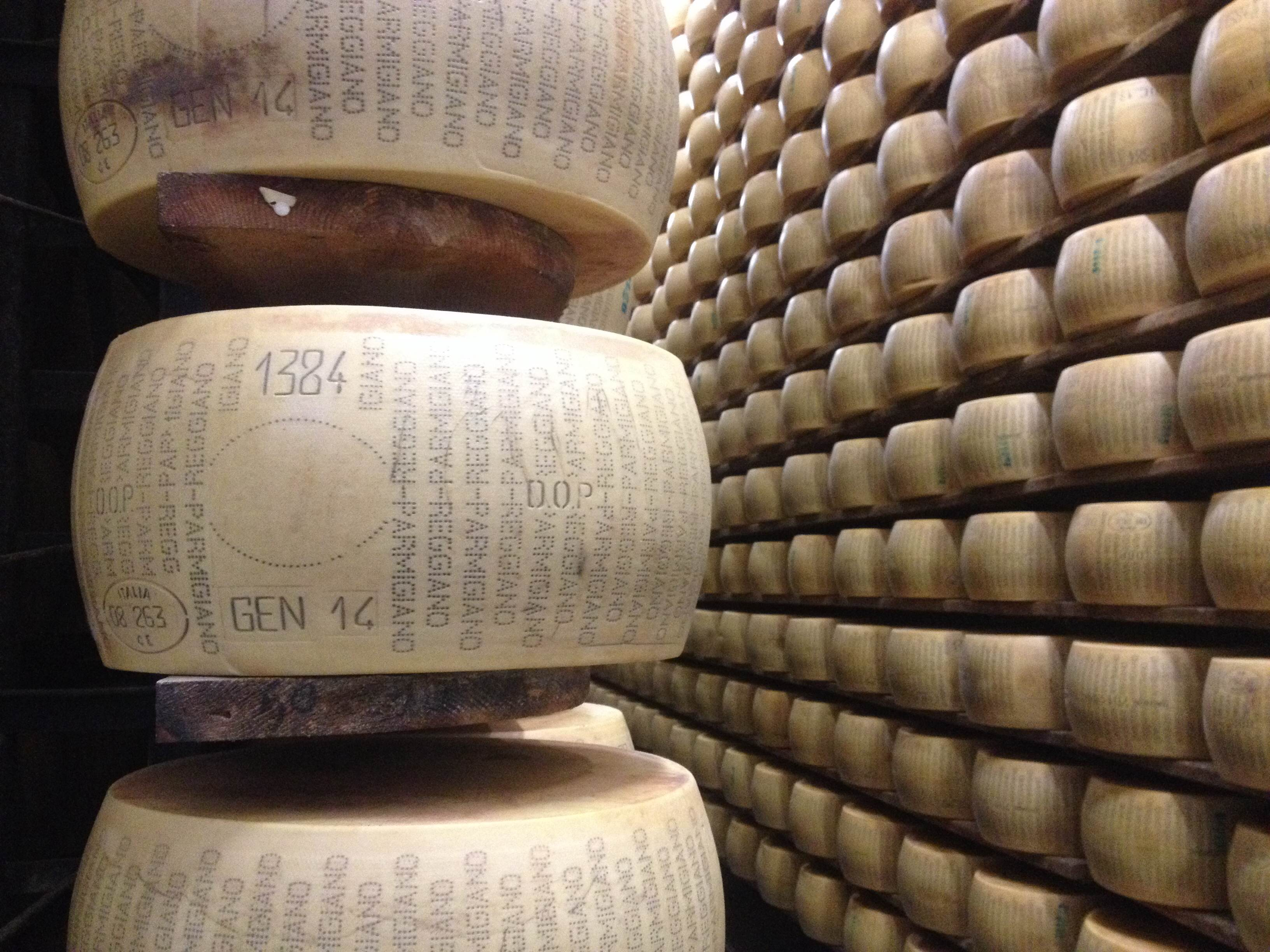
A wheel of Parmigiano Reggiano with PDO marking and "Parmigiano Reggiano" written around the side. An official certification is stamped into the central oval when it is graded.

Parmigiano Reggiano is made from unpasteurised cow's milk. The whole milk of the morning milking is mixed with the naturally skimmed milk of the previous evening's milking, resulting in a part skim mixture. This mixture is pumped into copper-lined vats, which heat evenly and contribute copper ions to the mix.

Starter whey (containing a mixture of certain thermophilic lactic acid bacteria) is added, and the temperature is raised to 33–35 °C (91–95 °F). Calf rennet is added, and the mixture is left to curdle for 10–12 minutes. The curd is then broken up mechanically into small pieces (around the size of rice grains). The temperature is then raised to 55 °C (131 °F) with careful control by the cheese-maker. The curd is left to settle for 45–60 minutes. The compacted curd is collected in a piece of muslin before being divided in two and placed in molds. There are 1,100 litres (290 US gal) of milk per vat, producing two cheeses each. The curd making up each wheel at this point weighs around 45 kilograms (99 lb). The remaining whey in the vat was traditionally used to feed the pigs from which prosciutto di Parma was produced. The barns for these animals were usually just a few metres away from the cheese production rooms.

The cheese is put into a stainless steel, round form that is pulled tight with a spring-powered buckle so the cheese retains its wheel shape. After a day or two, the buckle is released and a plastic belt imprinted numerous times with the Parmigiano Reggiano name, the plant's number, and month and year of production is put around the cheese, and the metal form is buckled tight again. The imprints take hold on the rind of the cheese in about a day and the wheel is then put into a brine bath to absorb salt for 20–25 days. After brining, the wheels are then transferred to the aging rooms in the plant for 12 months. Each cheese is placed on wooden shelves that can be 24 cheeses high by 90 cheeses long or 2,160 total wheels per aisle. Each cheese and the shelf underneath it is then cleaned every seven days, and the cheese is turned.

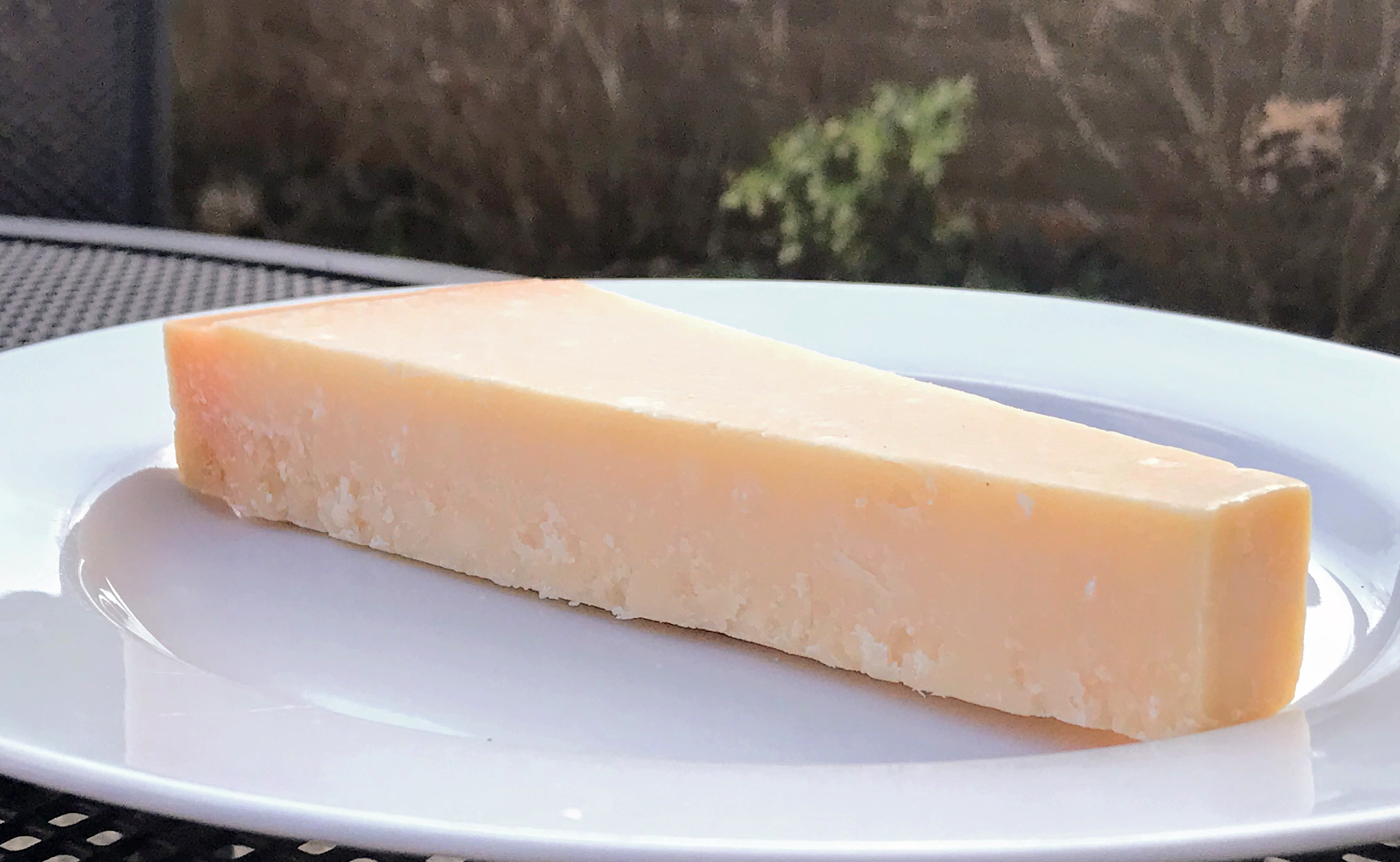
Parmigiano Reggiano

At 12 months, the Consorzio del Formaggio Parmigiano Reggiano (lit. 'Parmigiano Reggiano Cheese Consortium') inspects every wheel. The cheese is tested by one of the country's 25 master graders, known as battitore (lit. 'batter'), who taps each wheel with a small hammer (informally called martelletto) to identify undesirable cracks and voids within the wheel, a process that takes about six or seven seconds. There are three grading categories. Wheels in the top category are heat-branded on the rind with the Consorzio's logo. Those in the second tier bear the mark but have their rinds marked with lines or crosses all the way around to inform consumers that they are not getting top-quality Parmigiano Reggiano. Cheese in the third category is simply stripped of all rind markings.

Traditionally cows are fed only on grass or hay, producing grass-fed milk. Only natural whey culture is allowed as a starter, together with calf rennet.

The only additive allowed is salt, which the cheese absorbs while being submerged for 20 days in brine tanks saturated to near-total salinity with Mediterranean sea salt. The product ages for a minimum of one year and an average of two years; an expert from the Consorzio typically conducts a sound test with a hammer to determine if a wheel has finished maturing.

A typical Parmigiano Reggiano wheel is about 18–24 cm (7–9 in) high, 40–45 cm (16–18 in) in diameter, and weighs 38 kg (84 lb).

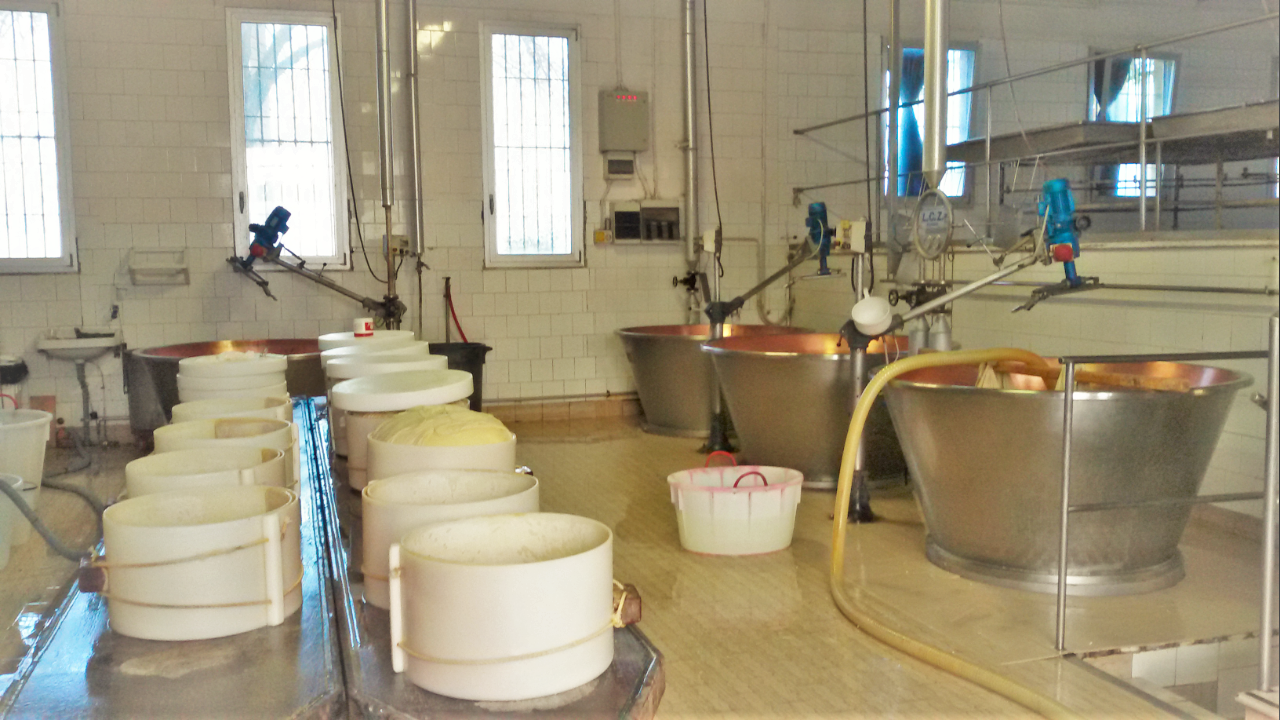
Copper-lined vats for the production of Parmigiano Reggiano

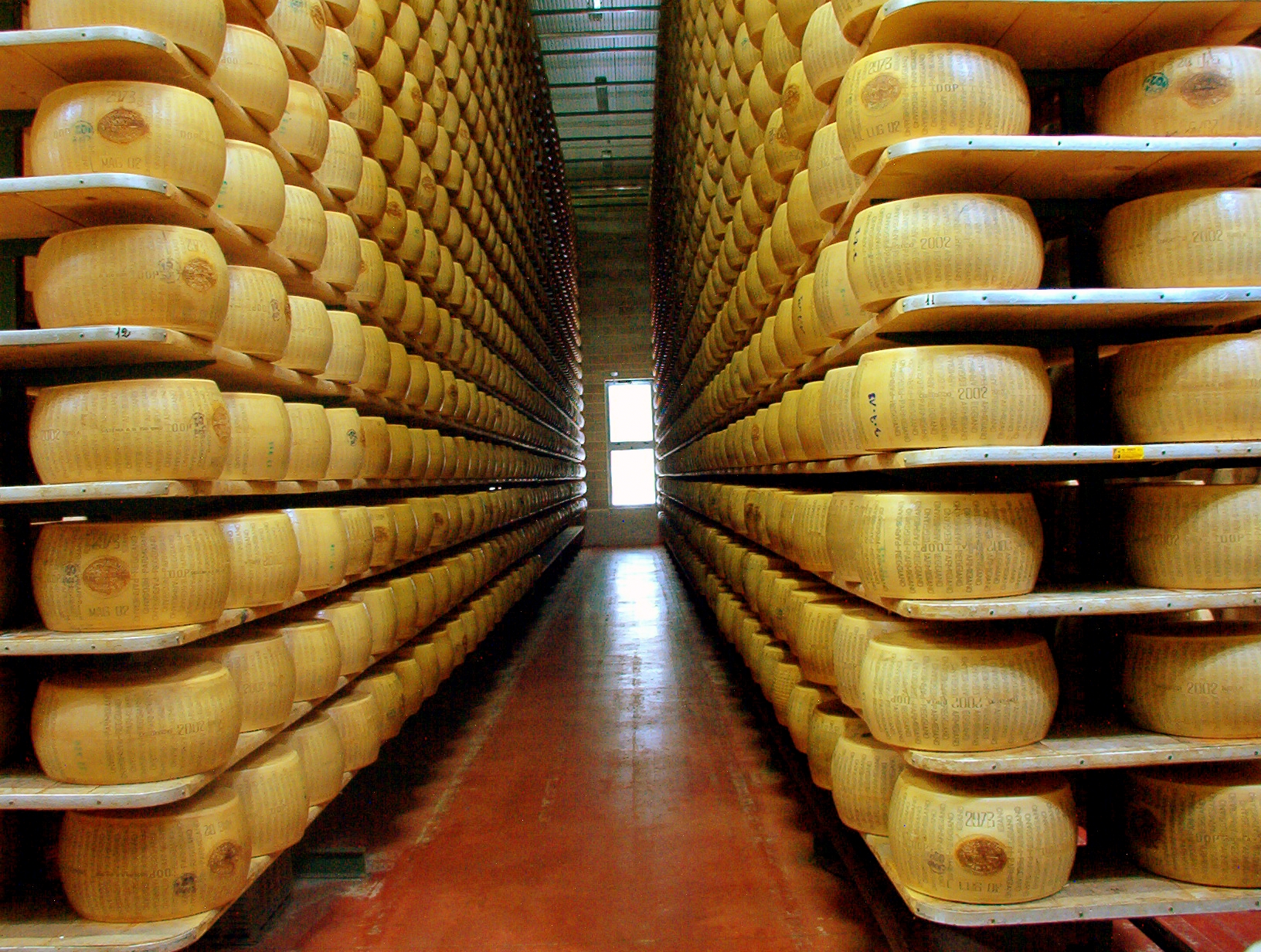
A Parmigiano Reggiano factory maturation room

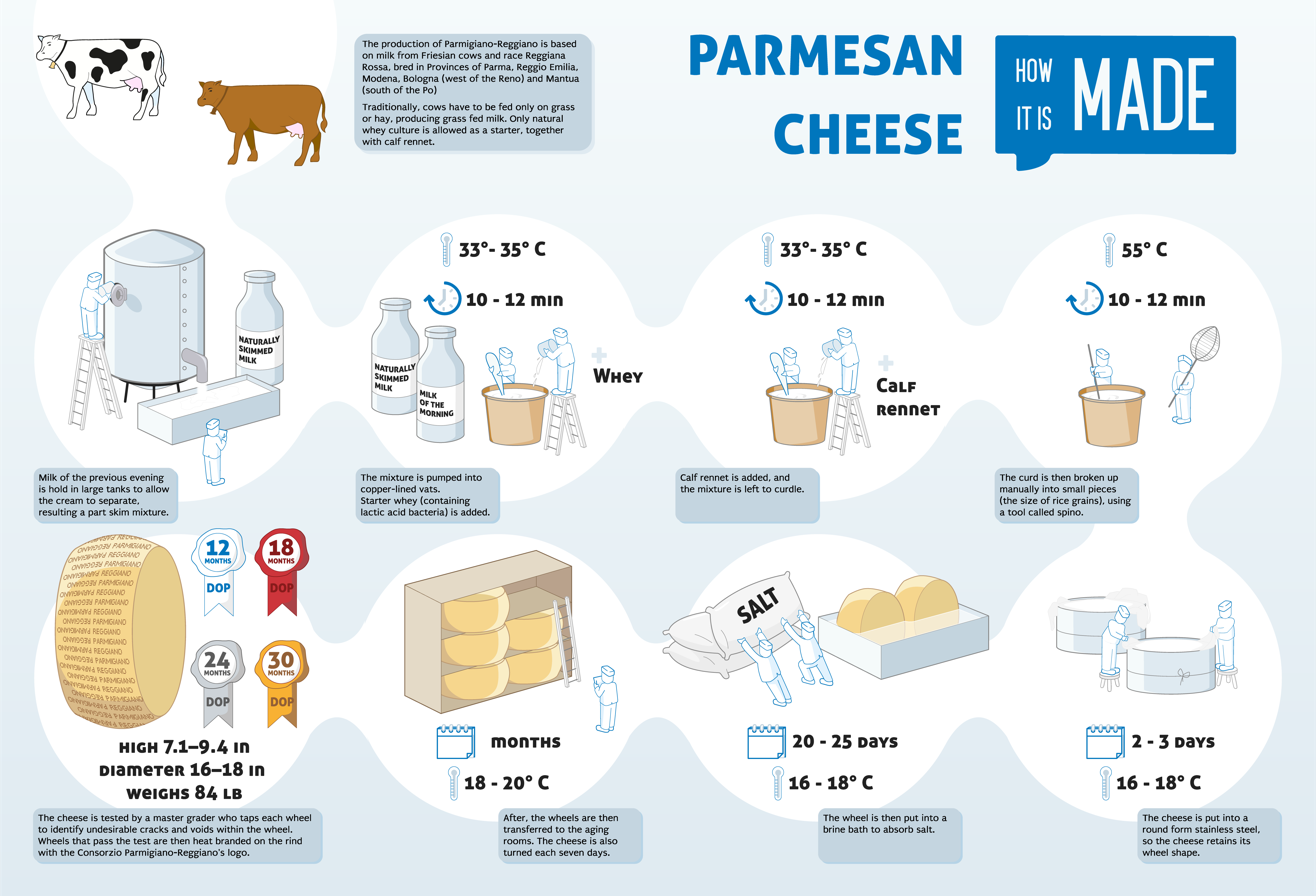
Product process of Parmesan cheese

== Consumption ==
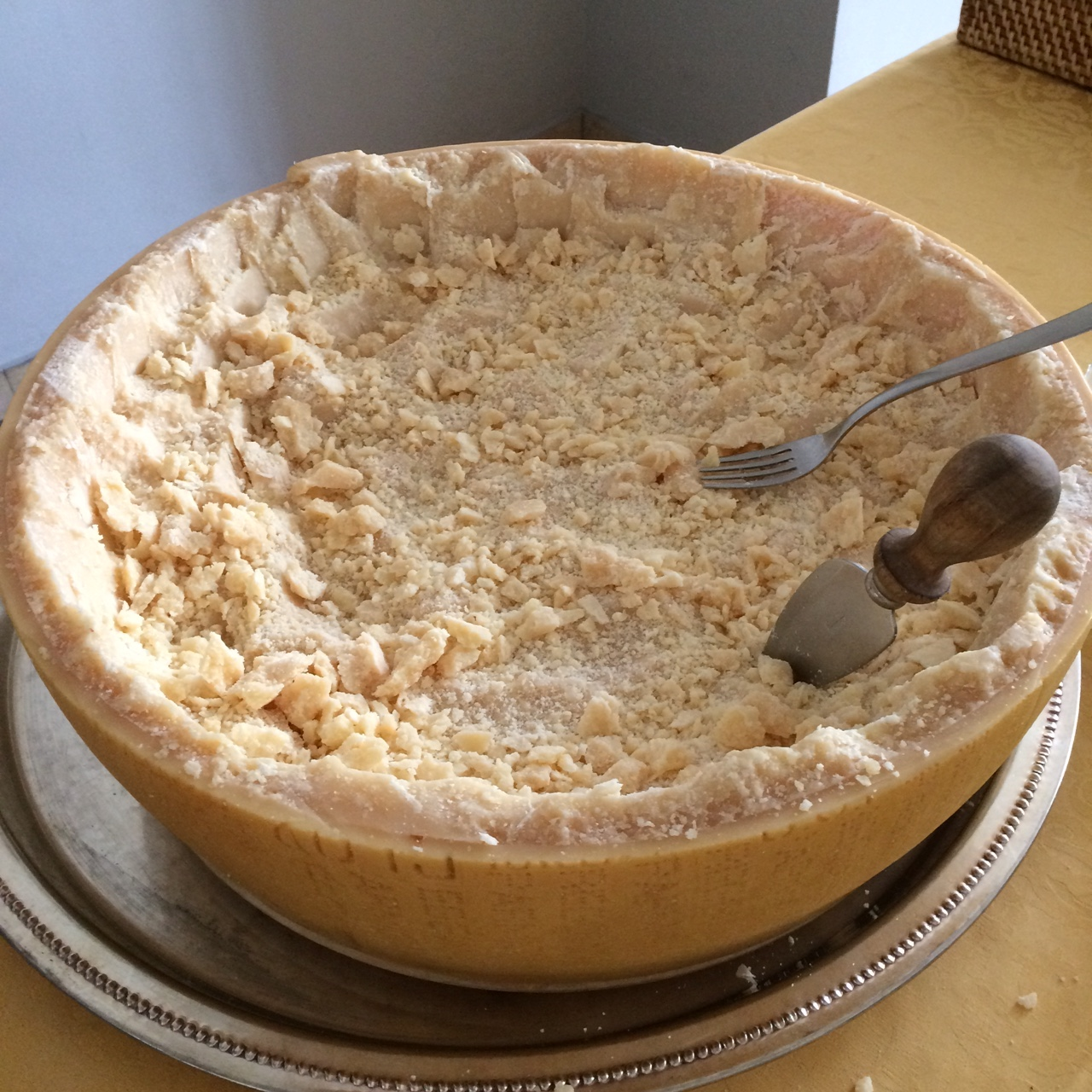
Half a wheel of Parmigiano Reggiano carved with a Parmesan knife and communal fork

Parmigiano Reggiano is commonly grated over pasta dishes, stirred into soups and risottos, and eaten on its own. It is often shaved or grated over other dishes such as salads. Slivers and chunks of the hardest parts of the crust are sometimes simmered in soups, broths, and sauces to add flavor. They can also be broiled and eaten as a snack if they have no wax on them, or infused in olive oil or used in a steamer basket while steaming vegetables.

== History ==
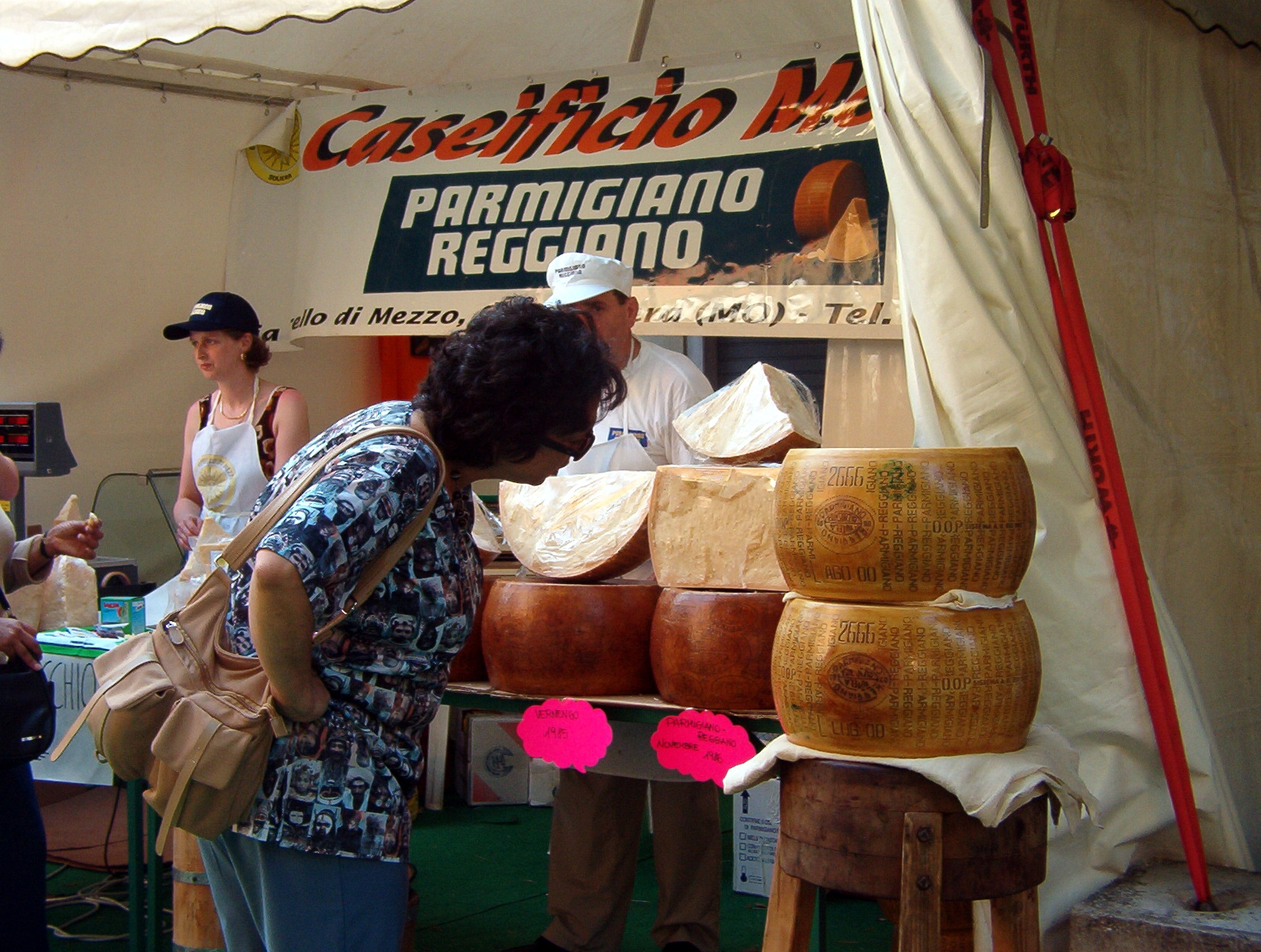
Parmigiano Reggiano festival in Modena, Italy; each wheel (block of cheese) costs €490.

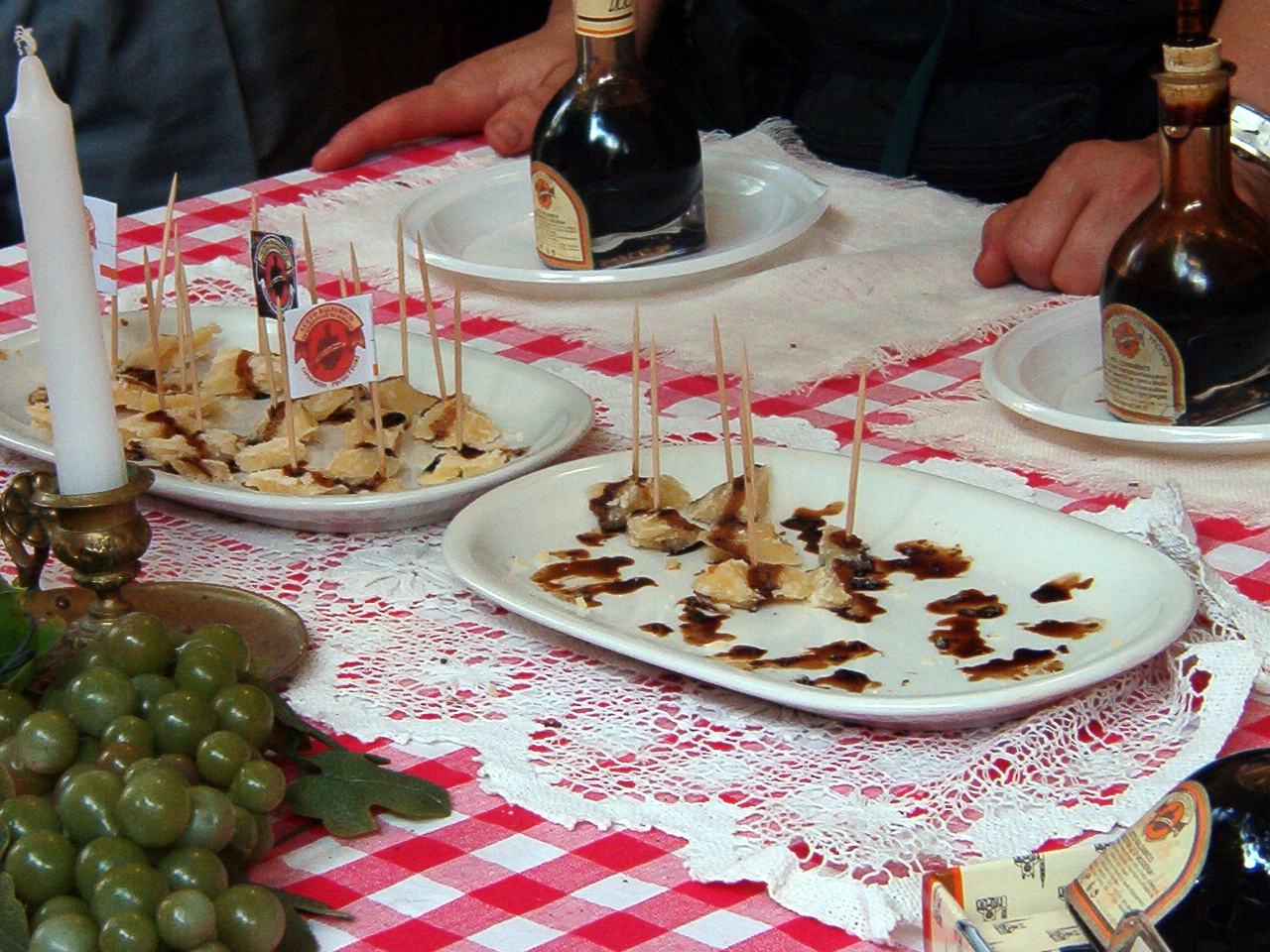
Parmigiano Reggiano being taste-tested at a festival in Modena, with balsamic vinegar drizzled on top

According to legend, Parmigiano Reggiano was created in the course of the Middle Ages in the comune (municipality) of Bibbiano, in the province of Reggio Emilia. Its production soon spread to the Parma and Modena areas. The earliest written record of this cheese is from the year 1254.

It was praised as early as 1348 in the writings of Boccaccio; in the Decameron, he invents a "mountain, all of grated Parmesan cheese", on which "dwell folk that do nought else but make macaroni and ravioli, and boil them in capon's broth, and then throw them down to be scrambled for; and hard by flows a rivulet of Vernaccia, the best that ever was drunk, and never a drop of water therein".

During the Great Fire of London of 1666, Samuel Pepys buried his "Parmazan cheese, as well as his wine and some other things" to preserve them.

In the memoirs of Giacomo Casanova, he remarked that the name Parmesan was a misnomer common throughout an "ungrateful" Europe in his time (mid-18th century), as the cheese was produced in the comune (municipality) of Lodi, in Lombardy, not Parma.

The industrialization and subsequent standardization of Parmesan production in the 19th and 20th centuries have reduced the heterogeneity in its sensory characteristics, but the key characteristics: hardness, sharpness, aroma, saltiness, and savoriness have remained.

=== Original texture ===
Alberto Grandi and others have claimed that early Parmesan was softer and fattier, with a black rind resembling the Wisconsin version. However, it is well documented that it has been consistently dry, hard, and grainy since the 15th century.

== Society and culture ==
Parmigiano Reggiano has been the target of organized crime in Italy, particularly the Mafia or Camorra, which ambush delivery trucks on the Autostrada A1, in northern Italy, between Milan and Bologna, hijacking shipments. The cheese is ultimately sold in southern Italy. Between November 2013 and January 2015, an organised crime gang stole 2,039 wheels of Parmigiano Reggiano from warehouses in northern and central Italy. Some banks (such as the Credito Emiliano) accept Parmesan cheese as collateral for a loan.

October 27 is designated "Parmigiano Reggiano Day" by The Consortium of Parmigiano Reggiano. This day celebrating the "king of cheeses" originated in response to the two earthquakes hitting the area of origin in May 2012. The devastation was profound, displacing tens of thousands of residents, collapsing factories, and damaging historical churches, bell towers, and other landmarks. Years of cheese production were lost during the disaster, about $50 million worth. To assist the cheese producers, Modena native chef Massimo Bottura created the recipe riso cacio e pepe. He invited the world to cook this new dish along with him launching "Parmigiano Reggiano Day"—October 27.

== Components ==
Cheese, Parmesan, Hard
Nutritional value per 100 g (3.5 oz)
- Energy: 392 kcal (1,640 kJ)
- Carbohydrates: 3.22 g
- Sugars: 0.8 g
- Dietary fiber: 0.0 g
- Fat: 25.83 g
- Saturated: 16.41 g
- Monounsaturated: 7.52 g
- Polyunsaturated: 0.57 g
- Protein: 35.75 g
Vitamins and minerals
| Vitamins | Quantity %DV^{†} |
| Vitamin A equiv. | 23% 207 μg |
| Thiamine (B1) | 3% 0.04 mg |
| Riboflavin (B2) | 25% 0.33 mg |
| Niacin (B3) | 2% 0.27 mg |
| Vitamin B6 | 5% 0.09 mg |
| Folate (B9) | 2% 7 μg |
| Vitamin B12 | 50% 1.2 μg |
| Vitamin C | 0% 0.0 mg |
| Vitamin D | 2% 19 IU |
| Vitamin E | 1% 0.22 mg |
| Vitamin K | 1% 1.7 μg |
| Minerals | Quantity %DV^{†} |
| Calcium | 91% 1184 mg |
| Iron | 5% 0.82 mg |
| Magnesium | 10% 44 mg |
| Phosphorus | 56% 694 mg |
| Potassium | 3% 92 mg |
| Sodium | 70% 1602 mg |
| Zinc | 25% 2.75 mg |
- Other constituents: Quantity
- Water: 29.16 g
- ^{†}Percentages estimated using US recommendations for adults, except for potassium, which is estimated based on expert recommendation from the National Academies.

Parmigiano Reggiano has many aroma-active compounds, including various aldehydes and butyrates. Butyric acid and isovaleric acid together are sometimes used to imitate the dominant aromas.

Parmigiano Reggiano is also particularly high in glutamate, containing as much as 1.2 g of glutamate per 100 g of cheese. The high concentration of glutamate explains the strong umami taste of Parmigiano Reggiano.

== Non-European Parmesan cheese ==
Report on Parmesan cheese and its imitations

Parmesan cheese made outside of the European Union is a family of hard-grating cheeses made from cow's milk and inspired by the original Italian cheese. They are generally pale yellow in color and usually used grated on dishes such as American pizza and Caesar salad. Some American generic "Parmesan" is sold already grated and has been aged for less than 12 months.

In many areas outside Europe the name Parmesan has become genericised and may denote any of several hard Italian-style grating types of cheese. These cheeses, chiefly from the US and Argentina, are often sold under names intended to evoke the original, such as Parmesan, Parmigiana, Parmesana, Parmabon, Real Parma, Parmezan, or Parmezano.

=== Non-European production ===
Parmesan cheese is defined differently in various jurisdictions outside of Europe.

- In the United States, the Code of Federal Regulations includes a Standard of Identity for "Parmesan and Reggiano cheese". This defines both aspects of the production process and of the final result. In particular, Parmesan must be made of cow's milk, cured for 10 months or more, contain no more than 32% water, and have no less than 32% milkfat in its solids.
- The Canadian regulation similarly includes moisture and fat levels, but has no restriction on aging time.

Kraft Foods is a major North American producer of grated Parmesan (a locally-legal term) and has been selling it since 1945.

Some non-European Parmesan producers have taken strong exception to the attempts of the European Union to globally control the trademark of the Parmesan name.

=== Adulteration controversy ===
Many American manufacturers have been investigated for allegedly going beyond the 4% cellulose limit (allowed as an anticaking agent for grated cheese, 21 CFR 133.146). In one case, FDA findings found "no Parmesan cheese was used to manufacture" a Pennsylvania manufacturer's grated cheese labeled "Parmesan", apparently made from a mixture of other cheeses and cellulose. The manufacturer pleaded guilty and received a sentence of three years' probation, a $5,000 fine, and 200 hours of community service.

== Similar cheeses ==
Parmesan is the best-known of the grana-type cheeses, but there are others.

=== Grana Padano ===
Grana Padano is an Italian cheese similar to Parmigiano Reggiano, but is produced mainly in Lombardy, where Padano refers to the Po Valley (Pianura Padana); the cows producing the milk may be fed silage as well as grass; the milk may contain slightly less fat, milk from several different days may be used, and must be aged a minimum of nine months.

=== Reggianito ===
Reggianito is an Argentine cheese similar to Parmigiano Reggiano. Developed by Italian-Argentine cheesemakers, the cheese is made in smaller wheels and aged for less time but is otherwise broadly similar.

== See also ==
- List of Italian cheeses
- Parmesan knife
