= Truckle =

Cylindrical wheel of cheese

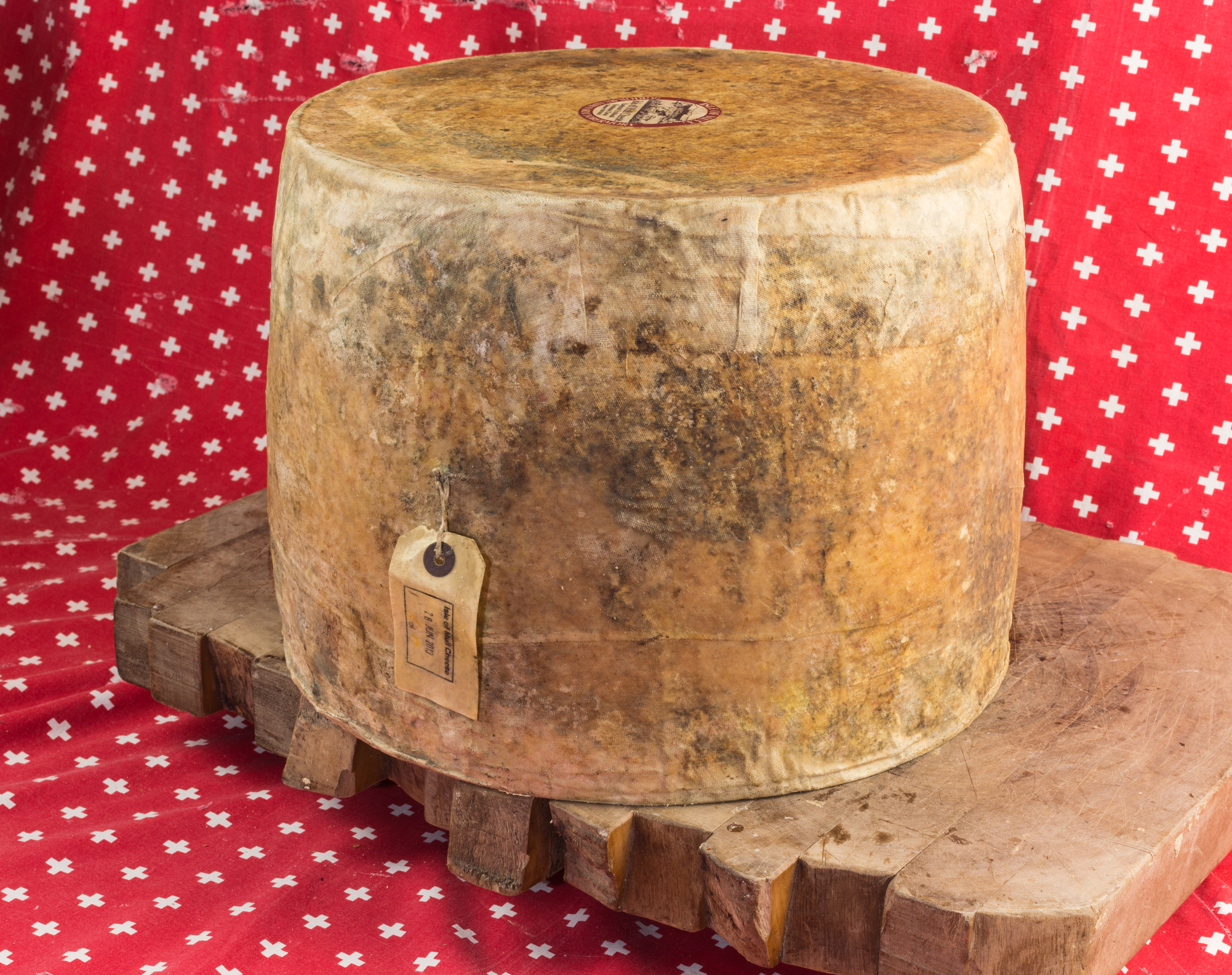
A truckle of farmhouse Cheddar cheese

A truckle is a cylindrical wheel of cheese, usually taller than it is wide, and sometimes described as barrel-shaped.‍‍ The word is derived from Latin trochlea, 'wheel, pulley'. Truckles vary greatly in size, from wax-coated cheeses sold in supermarkets, to 25-kilogram (55-pound) or larger artisanal cheeses.
