= List of Italian cheeses =

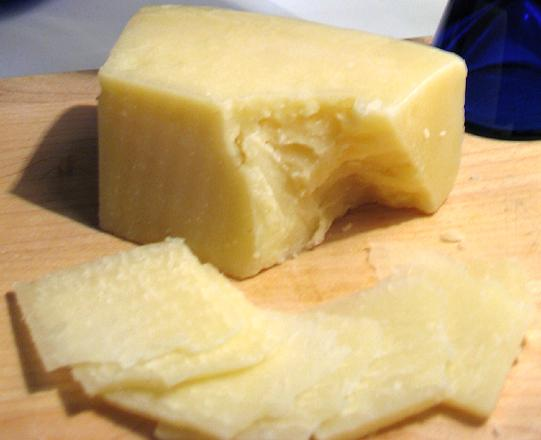
Pecorino romano

Italy has the largest variety of cheeses of any nation in the world, with over 2,500 traditional varieties, of which about 500 are commercially recognized and more than 300 have been granted protected designation of origin status (PDO, PGI and PAT). Fifty-two of them are protected at a European level. Of all the regions, Lombardy has the most such cheeses, with 77 varieties including Granone Lodigiano (ancestor of all Italian granular cheeses such as Grana Padano and Parmigiano Reggiano), mascarpone, and the well-known Gorgonzola blue cheese. The Italian cheeses mozzarella and ricotta are some of the most popular worldwide. (See List of Italian PDO cheeses for a list of those Italian cheeses which have protected designation of origin under EU law, together with their areas of origin.)

In terms of raw production volume, Italy is the third-largest cheese producer in the European Union, behind France and Germany.

== A ==
- Abbamar – Sardinia; a semi-soft cheese made from a mixture of cows' and sheep's milk
- Accasciato – Tuscany; (usually mixed) sheep and cow's milk cheese
- Acceglio – Piedmont; a fresh cows' milk cheese made in the area of Acceglio (province of Cuneo)
- Acidino (or formaggio acidino) – Veneto; a goats' milk cheese
- Aglino
- Agrì di Valtorta – Lombardy; made with fresh cows' or goats' milk in the Alta Valle Brembana (province of Bergamo)
- Ainuzzi – Sicily; a cows' milk cheese made in Cammarata and San Giovanni Gemini (province of Agrigento)
- Aladino
- Algunder Bauernkäse Halbfett (Italian: formaggio contadino semigrasso di Lagundo) – Burggrafenamt (Italian: Burgraviato), South Tyrol
- Algunder Butterkäse (Italian: formaggio di Lagundo) – Burggrafenamt (Italian: Burgraviato), South Tyrol
- Algunder Ziegenkäse (Italian: formaggio di capra di Lagundo) – a goats' milk cheese from Burggrafenamt (Italian: Burgraviato), South Tyrol
- Alpeggio di Triora – Province of Imperia, Liguria
- Alpepiana – Lombardy

- Alpepiana Macig – Lombardy

- Alpigiana – South Tyrol
- Alpkäse – South Tyrol
- Amatriciano – Lazio, around Amatrice and Leonessa
- Ambra di Talamello – originated in Marche, it is a type of formaggio di fossa, a designation for cheeses that are aged underground
- Ambrosiana
- Animaletti di Provola – Calabria
- Arunda – South Tyrol
- Aschbacher Magerkäse (Italian: formaggio Aschbach magro) – South Tyrol, from Burggrafenamt (Italian: Burgraviato)

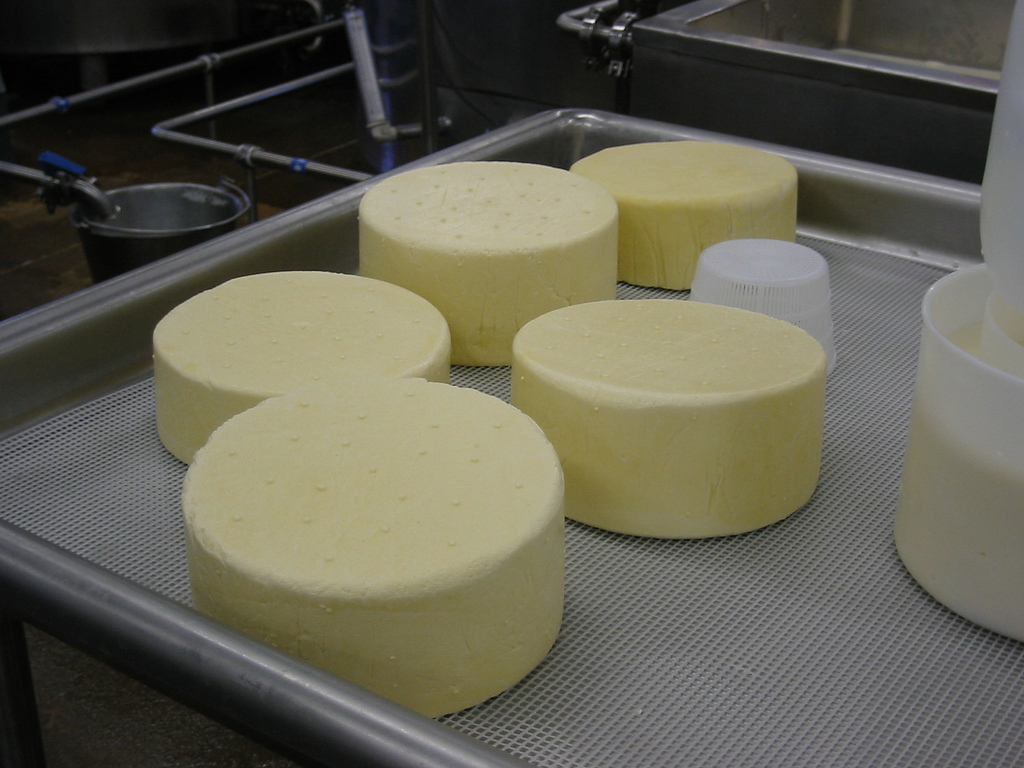
Asiago

- Asiago – DOP – Veneto, Trentino

- Asiago d'allevo (see Asiago)
- Asiago Montasio
- Asiago pressato (see Asiago)
- Asiago stravecchio

- Asìno – Friuli-Venezia Giulia

== B ==
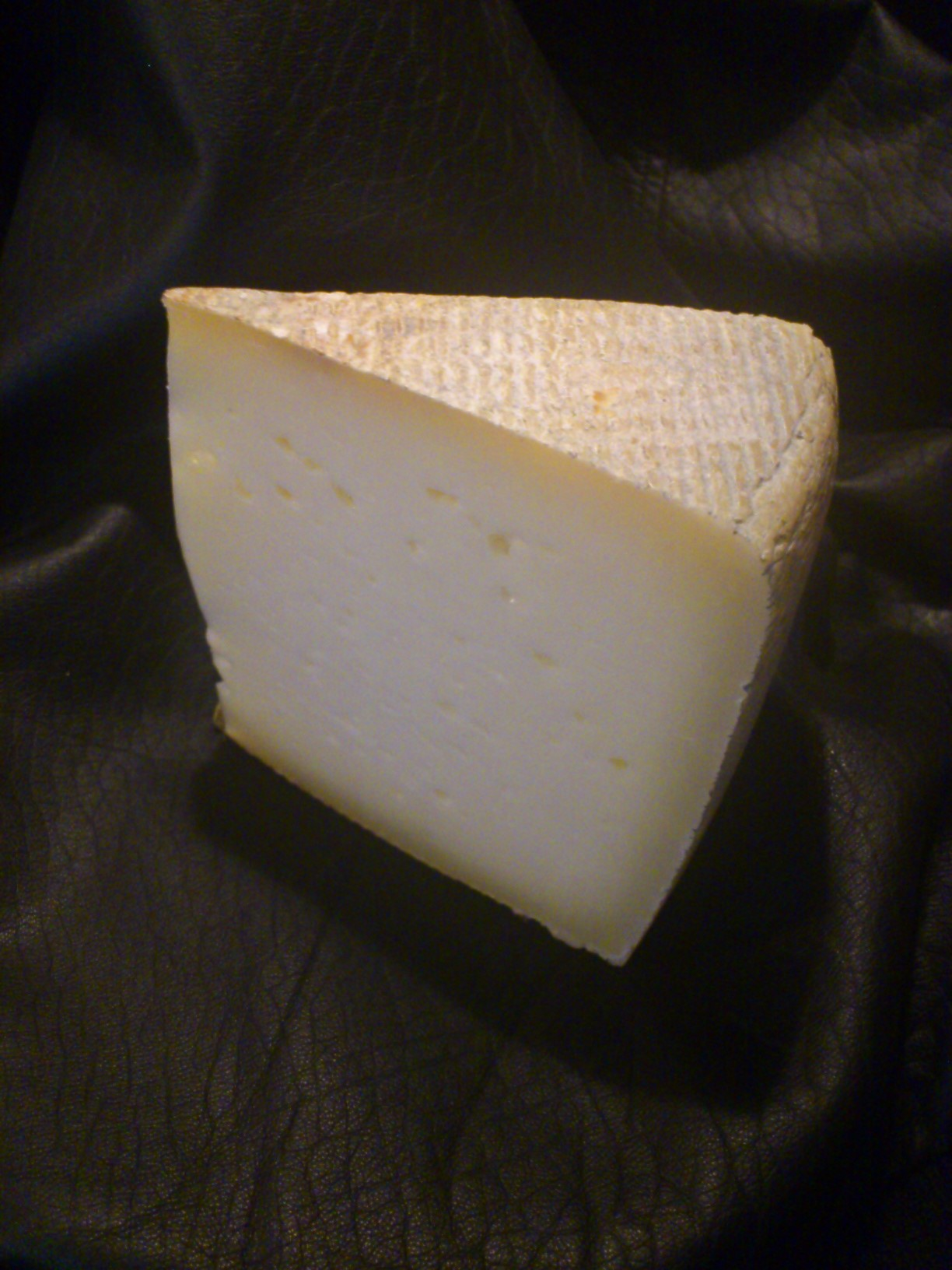
Bastardo del Grappa

- Baciodilatte – Piedmont
- Bagòs (synonym for Bagòss)
- Bagoss (synonym for Bagòss)
- Bagòss – Lombardy; a grana coloured with saffron from the comune (municipality) of Bagolino
- Bagòss di Bagolino (synonym for Bagòss)
- Baricot
- Bastardo del Grappa – Veneto; a cheese traditionally made with mixed milks, hence 'bastardo', in the area of Monte Grappa
- Bauernkäse – South Tyrol; a cheese made from pasteurised, semi-skimmed cow's milk around Meran and Vinschgau
- Bebé di Sorrento – Campania; a cow's milk cheese produced in a similar manner to caciocavallo sorrentino in the Sorrentine Peninsula, in the province of Naples
- Beddo – Piedmont; a soft, compact, white-bodied cheese made from cow's milk in the lower Cervo Valley in the comune of Pralungo and the Oropa valley in the comune of Biella
- Bedura
- Begiunn − Piedmont; a creamy-granular ricotta made in summer in the alpine pastures of Sauze d'Oulx and San Sicario (comune of Cesana Torinese) in the upper Val di Susa, and also in Bardonecchia (Province of Turin)

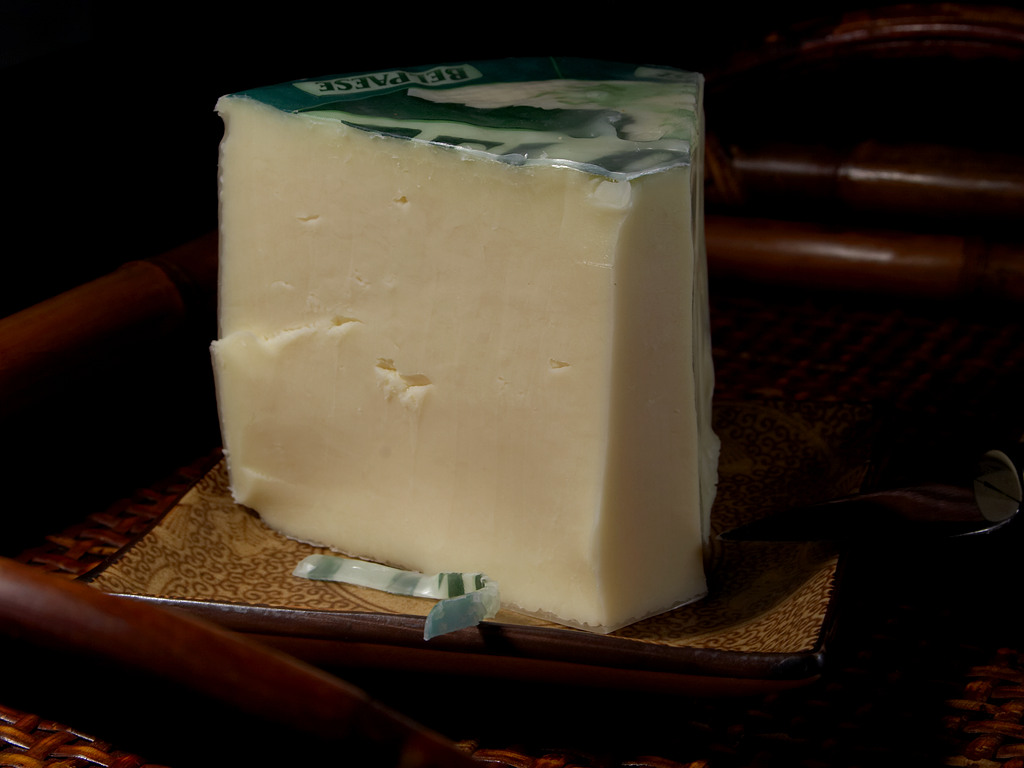
Bel Paese

- Bel Paese – Lombardy
- Bella Badia – South Tyrol; a soft cow's milk cheese, or recent introduction, made in the commune of Bruneck with milk from the mountain farmsteads of the Puster Valley
- Bella Lodi – Lombardy; typical Italian hard cheese from Lodi, "Granone" lodigiano
- Belicino – Sicily; a fresh sheep's mik cheese from the Belice valley, containing stoned olives of the type Oliva da Tavola Nocellara del Belice. The cheese, whose origins are post-World Two, is made within the communal territories of Calatafimi, Castelvetrano, Poggioreale, Salaparuta, Campobello di Mazara, Gibellina, Santa Ninfa, Petrosino and Salemi.
- Belmonte – Lombardy
- Bettelmatt – Piedmont
- Bergkäse – South Tyrol
- Bernardo – Lombardy
- Biancospino – Sardinia
- Bocconcini – Campania
- Bocconcini alla panna di bufala – Campania
- Bianco verde – Trentino; a cows' milk cheese from Rovereto

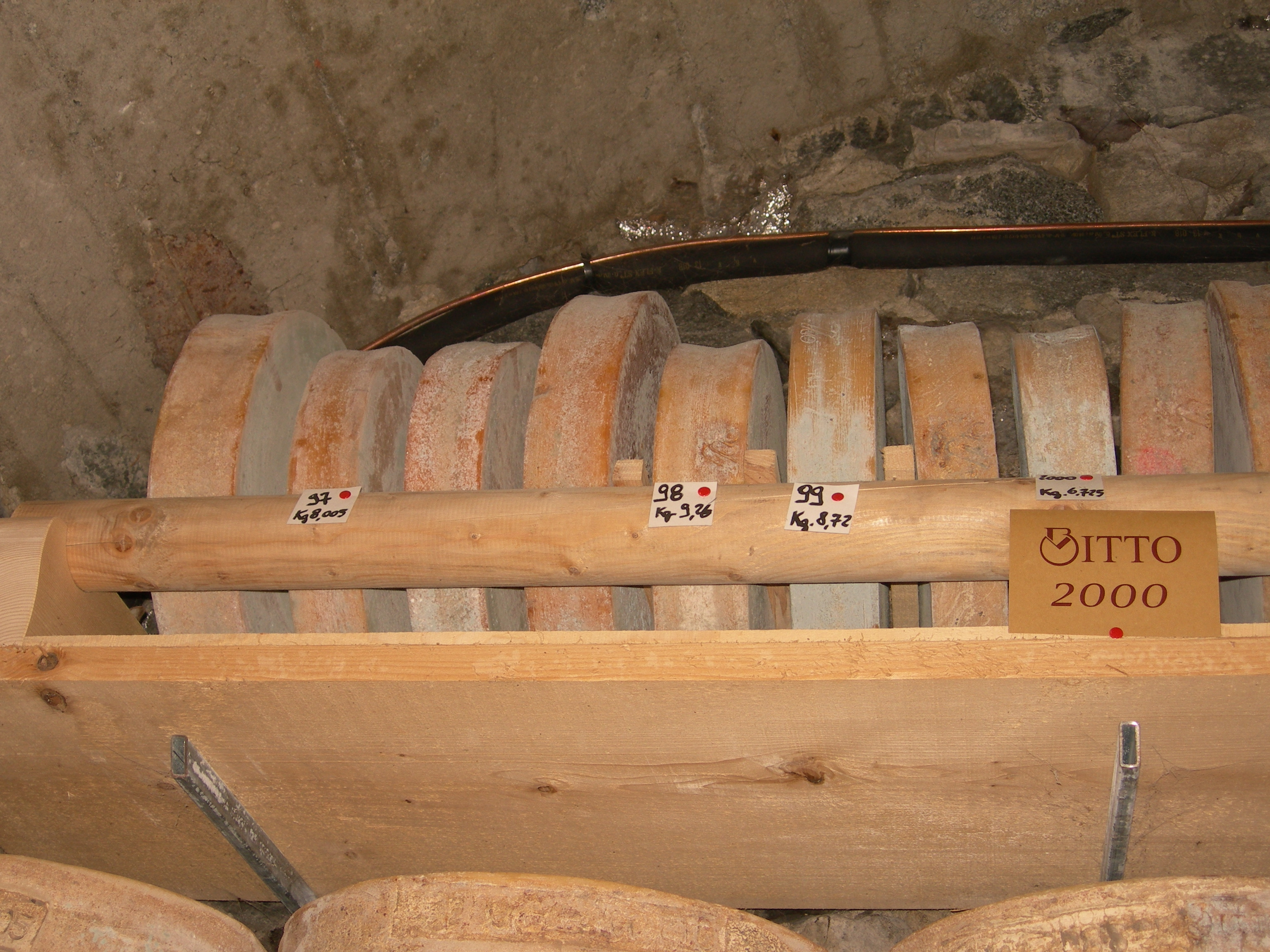
Bitto

- Bitto – DOP – Lombardy

- Bitto d'Alpe
- Bitto Valtellina (synonym for Bitto)

- Bleu d'Aoste – Aosta Valley
- Blu

- Blu Alpi Cozie – Piedmont
- Blu Antico
- Blu del Moncenisio – Piedmont

- Blu del Moncenisio d'alpeggio – Piedmont

- Blu di Lodi – Lombardy
- Blu di montagna – Piedmont
- Blu Val Chiusella – Piedmont

- Bonassai – Sardinia
- Bonrus – Piedmont
- Boscatella di Fiavè – Trentino; a recently developed soft cheese made in Fiavè
- Boschetto al Tartufo – Tuscany; a cheese incorporating pieces of white truffle
- Bormino – Lombardy
- Boves – Piedmont

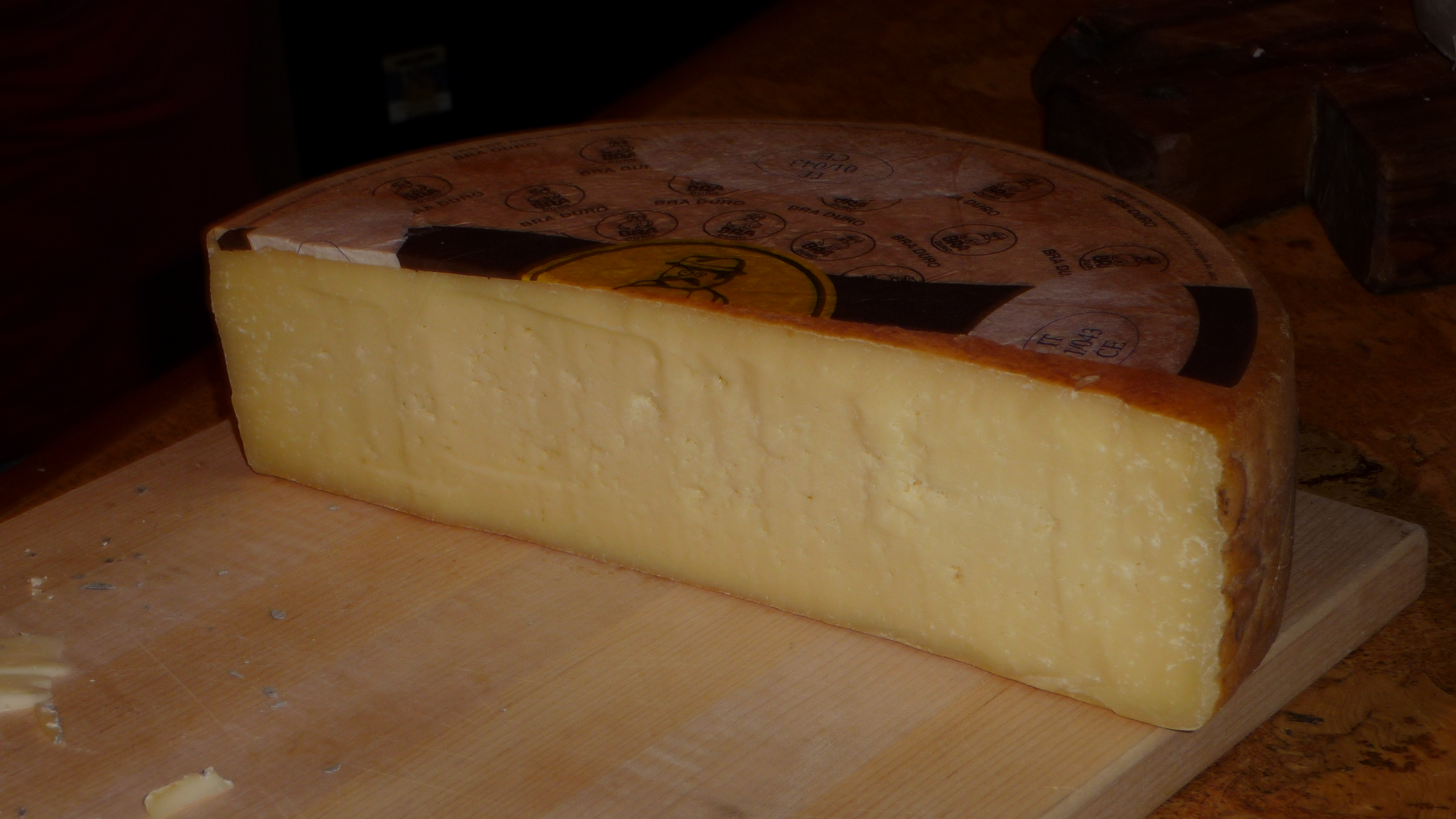
Bra duro cheese

- Bra – DOP – Province of Cuneo, Piedmont; made in three varieties:

- Bra d'alpeggio
- Bra duro
- Bra tenero

- Branzi – Val Brembana, Lombardy, a similar cheese to Formai del Mut
- Brebidor – Sardinia; a soft sheep's milk cheese
- Brebiblu – Sardinia; a modern, soft, 'blue' (really green) sheep's milk cheese inoculated with Penicillium roqueforti, made by Argiolas Formaggi in Dolianova (Province of Cagliari)
- Brescianella – Lombardy
- Bricchetto tartufo
- Bros Brös) – Langhe, Piedmont
- Brös – Piedmont, Liguria
- Brus (see Brös) – Piedmont, Liguria

- Brus da latte
- Brus da ricotta

- Bruss (see Brös)

- Bruss delle Langhe (see Brös) – Piedmont
- Bruss di Castelmagno – Piedmont
- Bruss di Frabosa – Piedmont

- Bruz

- Bruz d'Murazzan – Piedmont
- Bruz d'Murazzanivan – Piedmont

- Bruzzu – Piedmont, Liguria
- Budino di capra con uvetta e vin santo
- Bufalona

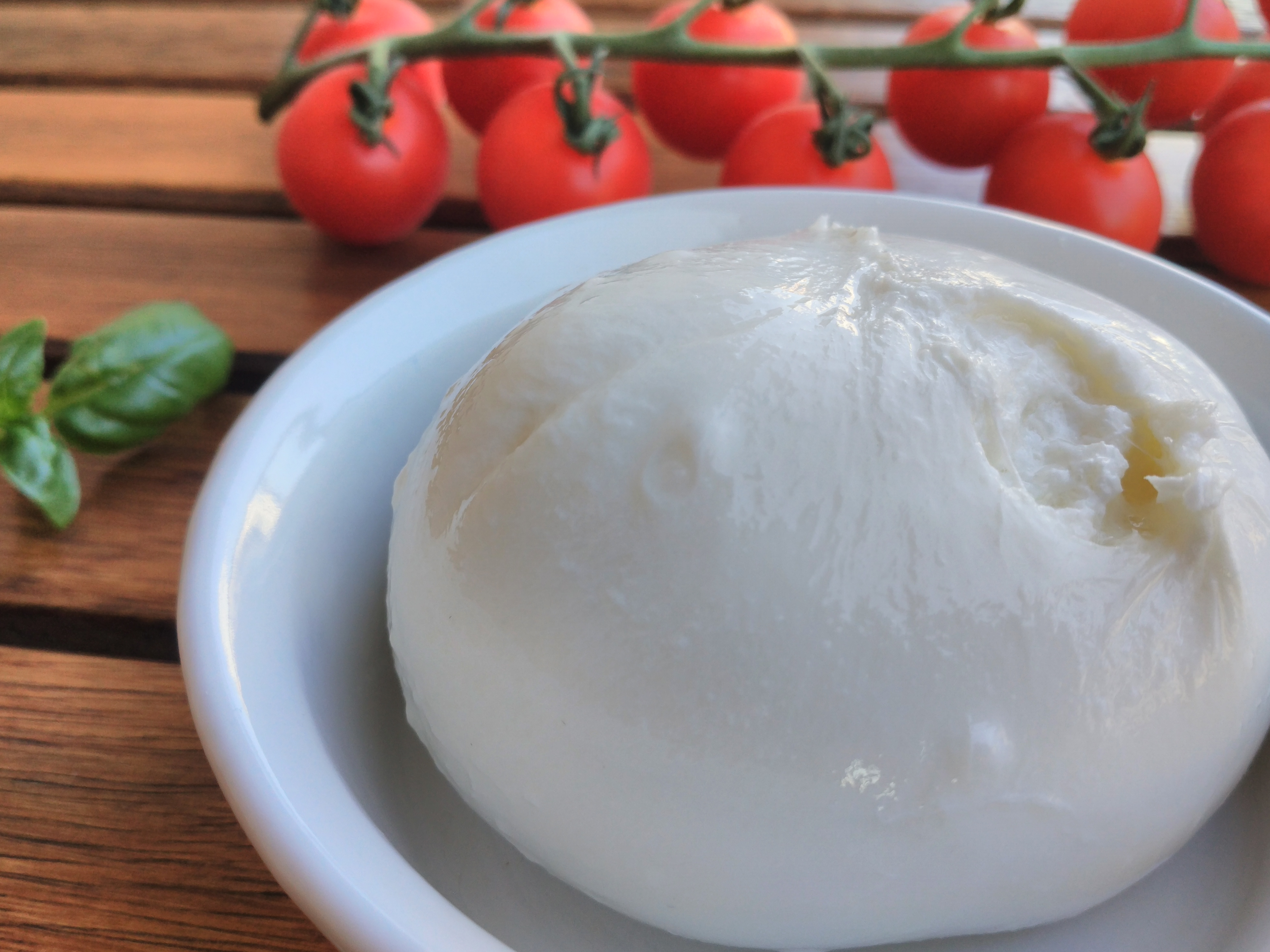
A burrata

- Burrata – type of mozzarella, stuffed with a mixture of mozzarella and cream

- Burrata delle Murge – Apulia; a Burrata produced since the early twentieth century in Andria (BA) and Martina Franca
- Burrata di Andria – Apulia; Burrata with PGI status
- Burrata di bufala – made from the milk of water buffalo

- Burrell – Lazio
- Burrino – Basilicata, Molise, Campania, Calabria

- Burrino e burrata di bufala (water buffalo's milk cheeses from Campania)
- Burrino farcito con soppressata – Basilicata
- Burrino in corteccia – Campania

- Busche – Veneto
- Butirro – Calabria
- Butterkäse (Lagundo) (see Algunder Butterkäse) – South Tyrol

== C ==
- Cachat – Piedmont
- Cacio

- Cacio a forma di limone – Marche
- Cacio di fossa – Emilia-Romagna; hard, sharp sheep's milk cheese, not unlike pecorino
- Cacio di vacca bianca – Abruzzo
- Cacio Etrusco Cencelle – Tarquinia, Lazio
- Cacio Etrusco Tarquinia – Tarquinia, Lazio
- Cacio figurato – Sicily
- Cacio magno – Lazio

- Cacio magno alle erbe – Lazio

- Cacio marcetto – Abruzzo
- Cacio ubriaco – Tuscany

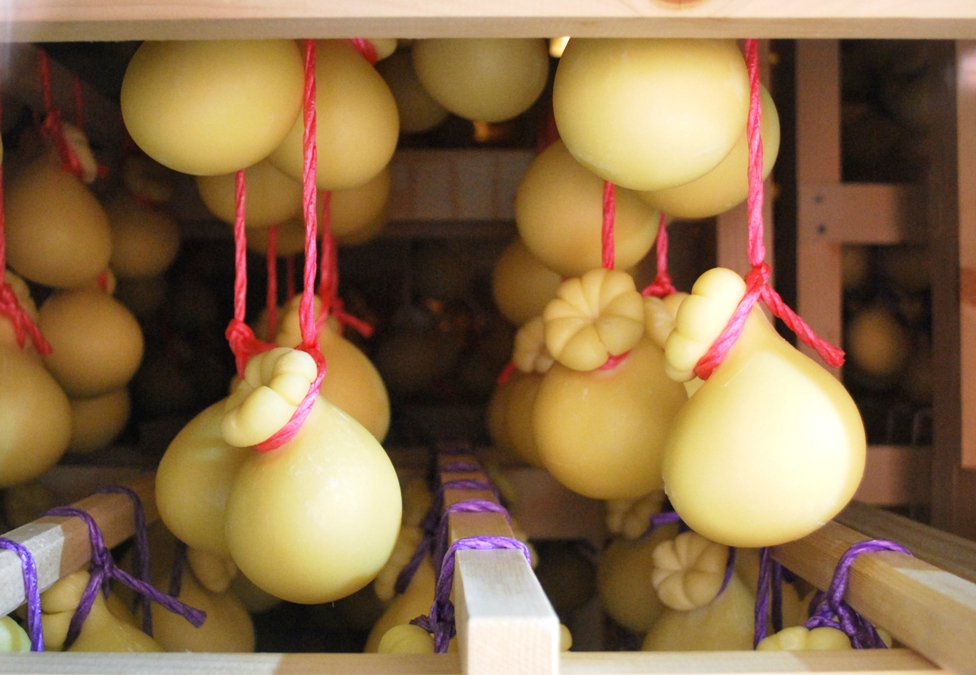
Straddled forms of caciocavallo hang to age

- Caciocavallo

- Caciocavallo abruzzese – Abruzzo
- Caciocavallo affumicato – Campania
- Caciocavallo del Monaco – Campania
- Caciocavallo di Grotta – Puglia
- Caciocavallo di bufala – Campania; in both smoked and un-smoked varieties, from Lazio)
- Caciocavallo di Castelfranco in Misciano – Campania
- Caciocavallo di Cimina – Calabria
- Caciocavallo farcito – Campania
- Caciocavallo di Godrano – Sicily
- Caciocavallo ragusano – DOP – Sicily; former name for the cheese now officially listed as Ragusano
- Caciocavallo silano – DOP – Calabria, Basilicata, Campania, Molise and Puglia
- Caciocavallo podolico – Basilicata, Campania, Calabria, Puglia (from Gargano); takes the name from the breed of the cow

- Caciocavallo podolico campano – Campania
- Caciocavallo podolico picentino – Campania

- Caciocotto – Basilicata
- Caciofiore aquilino – Abruzzo
- Cacioforte – Campania
- Cacioreale – Lombardy
- Cacioricotta – Campania, Abruzzo, Lazio, Calabria, Basilicata, Apulia

- Cacioricotta campana – Campania
- Cacioricotta di bufala – Lazio
- Cacioricotta di capra cilentina – Cilento, Campania
- Cacioricotta fresca – Lazio
- Cacioricotta lucano – Apulia, Campania, and especially Basilicata
- Cacioricotta pugliese – Apulia

- Caciotta – Central and Southern Italy

- Caciotta amiatina – Tuscany
- Caciotta al peperoncino – Campania
- Caciotta calabra – Calabria
- Caciotta campana – Campania
- Caciotta del Fermano – Marche
- Caciotta del Montefeltro – Marche
- Caciotta del Monte Lazzarina – Emilia-Romagna
- Caciotta della Lunigiana – Tuscany
- Caciotta misto pecora
- Caciotta degli Elimi – Sicily
- Caciotta dei Monti della Laga – Lazio
- Caciotta della sabina – Lazio
- Caciotta di Asiago – Veneto
- Caciotta di Brugnato – Liguria
- Caciotta di capra – Friuli-Venezia Giulia
- Caciotta di latte caprino
- Caciotta di Montemauro – Emilia-Romagna
- Caciotta di pecora
- Caciotta genuina romana – Lazio
- Caciotta mista della Tuscia – Lazio
- Caciotta di bufala – Lazio

- Caciotta di bufala pontina

- Caciotta Manzone
- Caciotta sarda – Sardinia
- Caciotta senese – Tuscany
- Caciotta toscana – Tuscany
- Caciotta vaccina frentana – Abruzzo

- Caciottina

- Caciottina canestrata di Sorrento – Province of Naples, Campania
- Caciottina di bufala
- Caciottina di bufala di Amaseno – Lazio
- Caciottina di bufala di Amaseno aromatizzata – Lazio

- Caciottone di Norcia – Umbria; applied for PGI status in 2021
- Cadolet di capra – Val Camonica, Lombardy
- Cafone – Sardiniaia
- Calcagno – a type of pecorino cheese prepared using raw sheep milk and peppercorns, originally from Sardinia
- Callu de cabreddu – Sardinia
- Canestrato – Trentino, Apulia, Basilicata, Sicily, Sardinia

- Canestrato crotonese – Calabria
- Canestrato d'Aspromonte – Calabria
- Canestrato di Calabria – Calabria

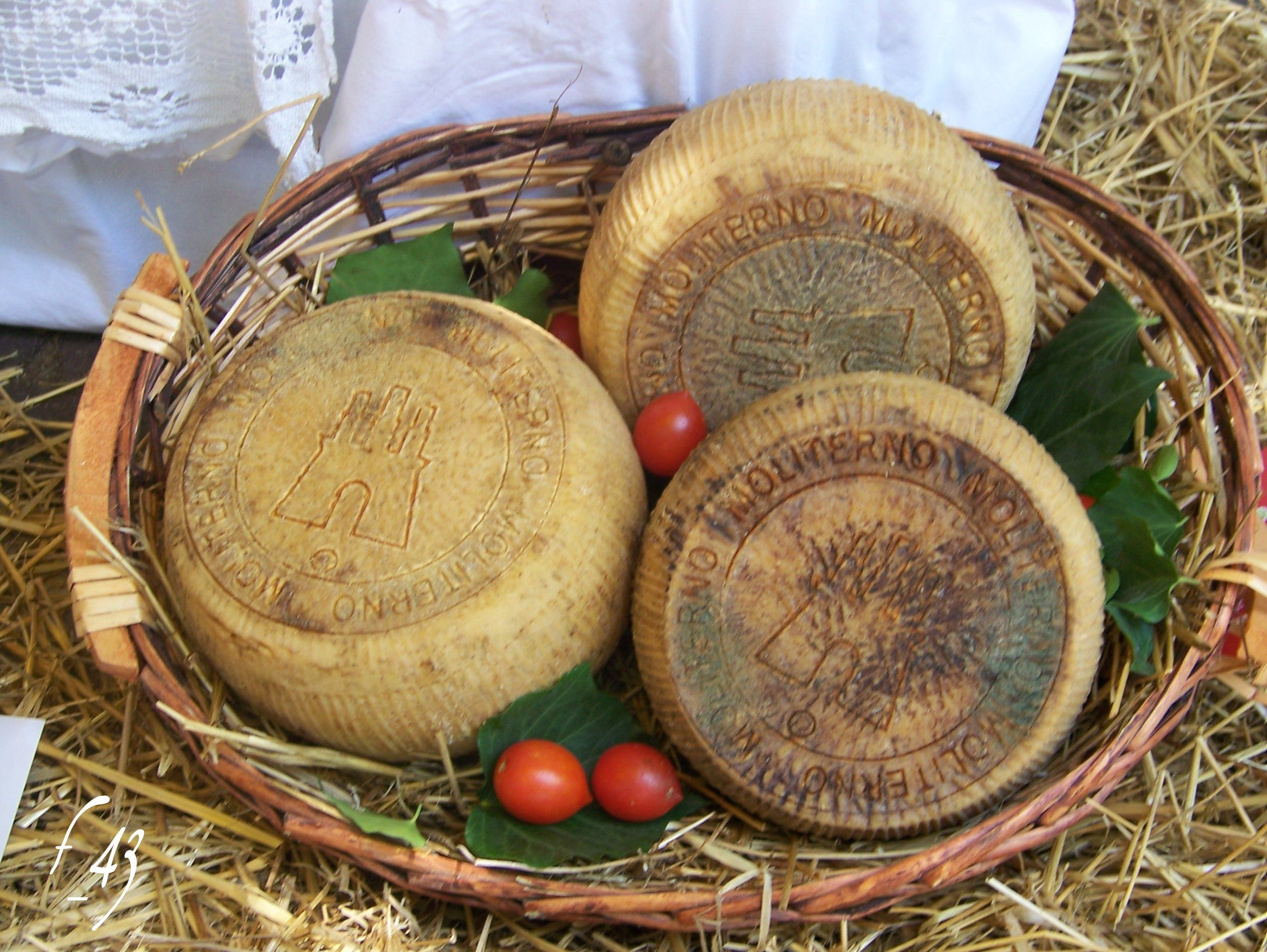
Canestrato di Moliterno

- Canestrato di Moliterno – hard mixed sheep's and goats' milk cheese from Apulia. It is matured for at least 60 days and may be eaten at table or grated. The PGI status was registered in 2010.
- Canestrato pugliese – Apulia; PDO cheese made in the province of Foggia
- Canestrato sardo – Sardinia
- Canestrato trentino – Trentino
- Canestrato vacchino – Sicily

- Candela di Langa – Piedmont
- Cansiglio – Province of Belluno, Veneto, province of Pordenone, Friuli-Venezia Giulia
- Cappello del Mago – Piedmont
- Capretta – Sardinia
- Capridor – Sardegna
- Caprini bergamaschi – Province of Bergamo, Lombardy
- Caprino (goats' cheese) – Piedmont, Lombardy, Veneto, Trentino, Friuli-Venezia Giulia, Calabria, Sardinia

- Caprino a coagulazione lattica – Lombardy
- Caprino a coagulazione presamica – Lombardy
- Caprino al lattice di fico – Marche
- Caprino al pepe di Bagnolo – Piedmont

- Caprino bicchierino – Piedmont

- Caprino da grattugia – Emilia-Romagna, Liguria
- Caprino dell'Aspromonte – Calabria
- Caprino degli Alburni – Campania
- Caprino della Carnia pasta dura e pasta morbida – Carnia, province of Udine, Friuli-Venezia Giulia
- Caprino della Limina – Calabria
- Caprino della Val Brevenna – Liguria
- Caprino della Val Vigezzo – Liguria
- Caprino di Baceno – Piedmont
- Caprino di Cavalese – Trentino
- Caprino di Demonte – Piedmont
- Caprino di malga delle Alpi Marittime – Piedmont
- Caprino di Montefalcone del Sannio – Molise
- Caprino di Rimella – Piedmont
- Caprino di Urbino – Marche
- Caprino Francese – Tuscany
- Caprino fresco – Abruzzo
- Caprino fresco veneto – Veneto
- Caprino lattico piemontese – Piedmont
- Caprino lombardo – Lombardy
- Caprino ossolano – Piedmont
- Caprino presamico piemontese – Piedmont
- Caprino sardo – Sardinia
- Caprino spazzacamino
- Caprino stagionato – Basilicata, Campania
- Caprino trentino – Trentino
- Caprino vaccino – Lombardy
- Caprino Valle – Piedmont
- Caprino valsesiano – Piedmont

- Cappuccetto Rosso – Piedmont
- Capriola
- Capritilla – Piedmont
- Carboncino – Piedmont
- Carletta-Tometta cremosa di pecora – Piedmont
- Carlina Robiola di pura capra
- Carmasciano – Campania
- Carnia – Carnia, province of Udine, Friuli-Venezia Giulia
- Casale de Elva – Province of Cuneo, Piedmont; cheese made in the comune (municipality) of Elva, in the upper Maira Valley, which may be sold fresh or aged. In the latter case it resembles Castelmagno cheese. Alternative names include Toma di Elva, Caso di Elva and Tumo de Caso).
- Casalina – Veneto
- Casareccio di Gorreto – Liguria
- Casàt Gardesano
- Casatella

- Casatella Romagnola – Emilia-Romagna
- Casatella Trevigiana – Veneto

- Casatta nostrana di Corteno Golgi – Lombardy
- Casciotta d'Urbino – DOP – Marche
- Casel Bellunese – Province of Belluno, Veneto
- Casera

- Casera Crotto
- Casera giovane Valtellina – Valtellina, Lombardy
- Casera uso monte

- Casieddu di Moliterno – Basilicata
- Casizolu – Sardinia

- Casizolu di pecora – Sardinia

- Caso

- Caso conzato – Campania
- Caso di Elva (synonym for Casale de Elva) – Piedmont
- Caso peruto – Campania

- Casolet – Lombardy, Trentino

- Casolet della Val di Sole – Lombardy

- Casoretta – Lombardy
- Cassatella
- Castel Ariund – strongly flavoured cows milk cheese from Entracque, in the Maritime Alps of the province of Cuneo, Piedmont, often eaten with the local honey

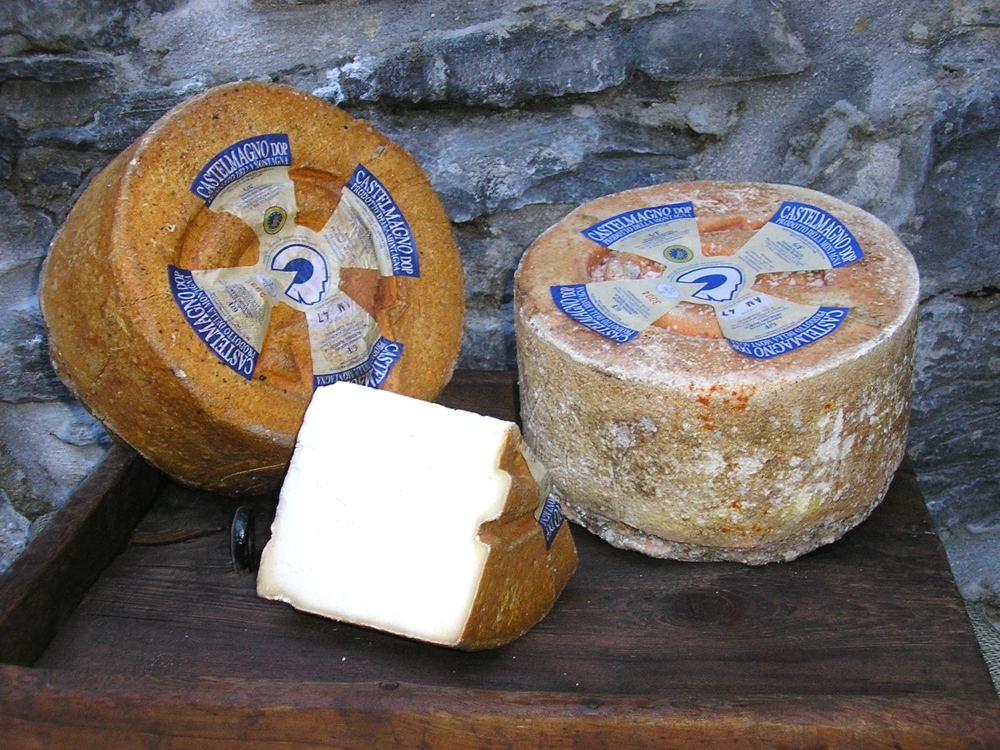
Castelmagno

- Castelmagno – DOP – Piedmont
- Castelrosso – Piedmont
- Casu – Sardinia

- Casu axedu – Sardinia
- Casu becciu – Sardinia
- Casu cundhídu (see Casu marzu) – Sardinia

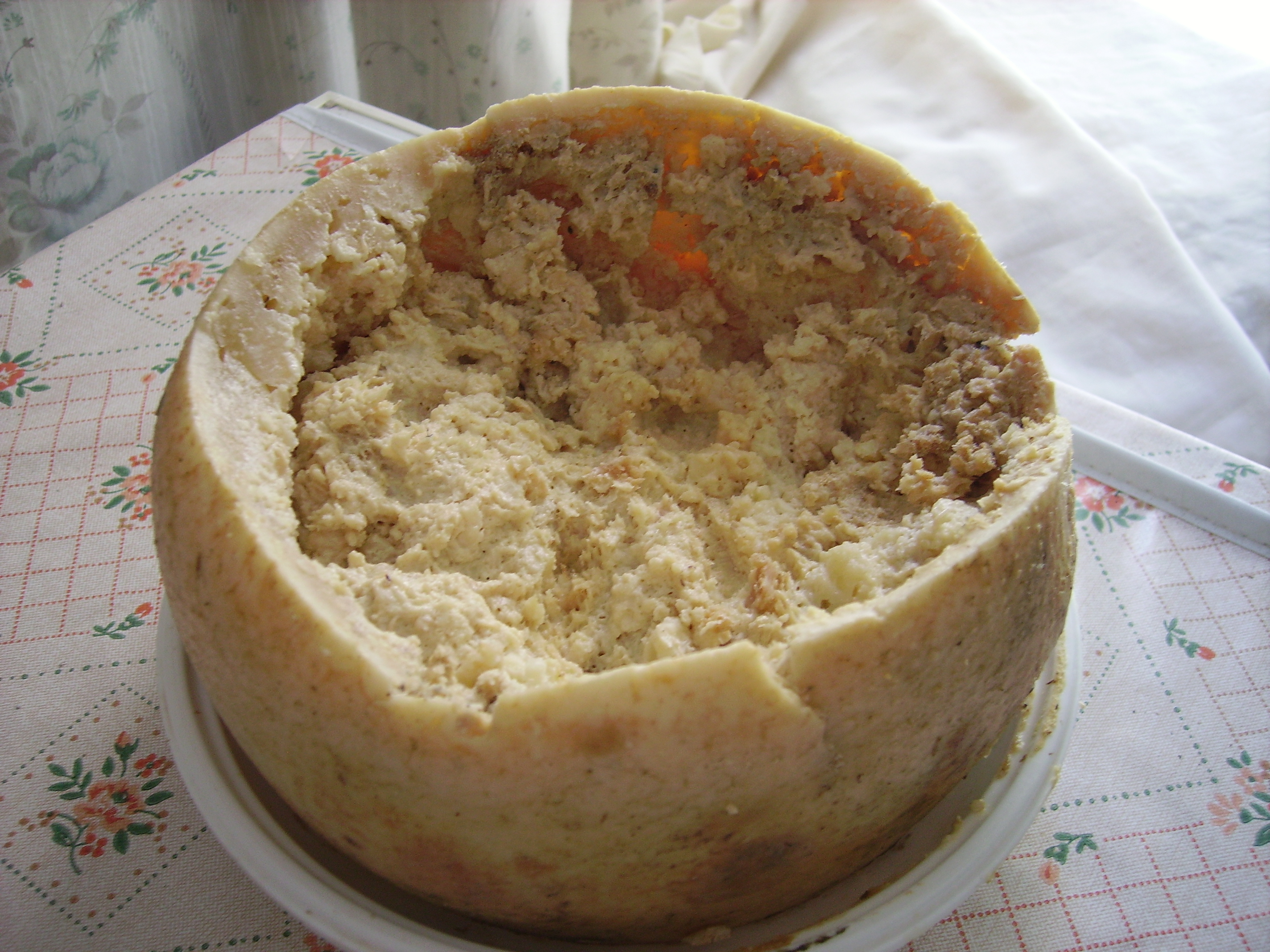
Casu martzu

- Casu martzu or formaggio marcio – traditional Sardinian sheep's milk cheese, notable for containing live insect larvae
- Casu modde (see Casu marzu) – Sardinia
- Casu de cabreddu – Sardinia
- Casu friscu – Formaggio fresco from Sardinia
- Casu spiattatu – Sardinia

- Cavrin (Cevrin) di Coazze – Piedmont; goat cheese
- Cesio – Veneto
- Chabri stagionato – Piedmont
- Charbonet
- Cherz – Veneto; a name used in Livinallongo del Col di Lana for Pressato
- Ciabutin – Piedmont
- Ciabutin al tartufo nero – Piedmont; with black truffle
- Cimbro – Veneto
- Cingherlino (Zincarlin) – Lombardy
- Cofanetto – Sicily
- Comelico – Veneto
- Conciato di San Vittore – Lazio
- Conciato romano – Lazio
- Contrin – Veneto
- Cosacavaddu ibleo – Sicily
- Costa d'Oro – Sardinia
- Crema

- Crema del Friuli – Friuli-Venezia Giulia
- Crema del Cuc – Friuli-Venezia Giulia
- Crema del Gerrei – Sardinia
- Crema di Fobello capra – Piedmont

- Crescenza – Lombardy
- Crottino al tartufo – Lombardy
- Crucolo – Trentino; cow's milk
- Crutin – Piedmont
- Çuç di mont – Friuli-Venezia Giulia
- Cuincir – Friuli-Venezia Giulia
- Cuor di Neve

- Cuor di Neve
- Cuor di Valle – Lombardy

- Cusiè – Piedmont

== D ==
- Darraghetto di Viareggio – Tuscany
- Degli Albanesi – Calabria
- Del Colle
- Delizia del Colle
- Devero
- Dobbiaco – South Tyrol
- Dolce Isola misto
- Dolcelatte – cheese related to Gorgonzola, made for the export market
- Dolce sardo – Sardinia
- Dolcezza d'Asiago – Veneto
- Dolomiti – Trentino
- D'ora ligure – Liguria
- Due latti quadrotta delle Langhe – Piedmont

== E ==
- Erborinato

- Erborinato di Artavaggio – Lombardy
- Erborinato di capra – Piedmont
- Erborinato di monte
- Erborinato di pecora delle Alpi Cozie – Piedmont
- Erborinato misto capra – Sardinia

- Ericino – Sicily
- Escarun di pecora – Piedmont

== F ==
- Falagone – Basilicata
- Farci-Provola – Calabria
- Fatulì della Val Saviore – Lombardy
- Fallone di Gravina – Apulia
- Felciata di Calabria – Calabria
- Fiacco di capra – Lombardy
- Figliata – Apulia
- Fior – Trentino

- Fior di campo
- Fior di latte
- Fior di latte laziale – Lazio
- Fior di monte – Trentino

- Fiordivalle – Sardinia
- Fiore

- Fiore sardo – DOP – Sardinia
- Fiore sicano – Sicily

- Fioreta – Veneto
- Fiorone della Valsassina – Province of Lecco, Lombardy
- Fiurit – Lombardy
- Flors – Friuli-Venezia Giulia
- Fodòm – Livinallongo del Col di Lana, province of Belluno, Veneto
- Fondue – Aosta Valley, Piedmont
- Fontal – Trentino

- Fontal Fiavè – Trentino

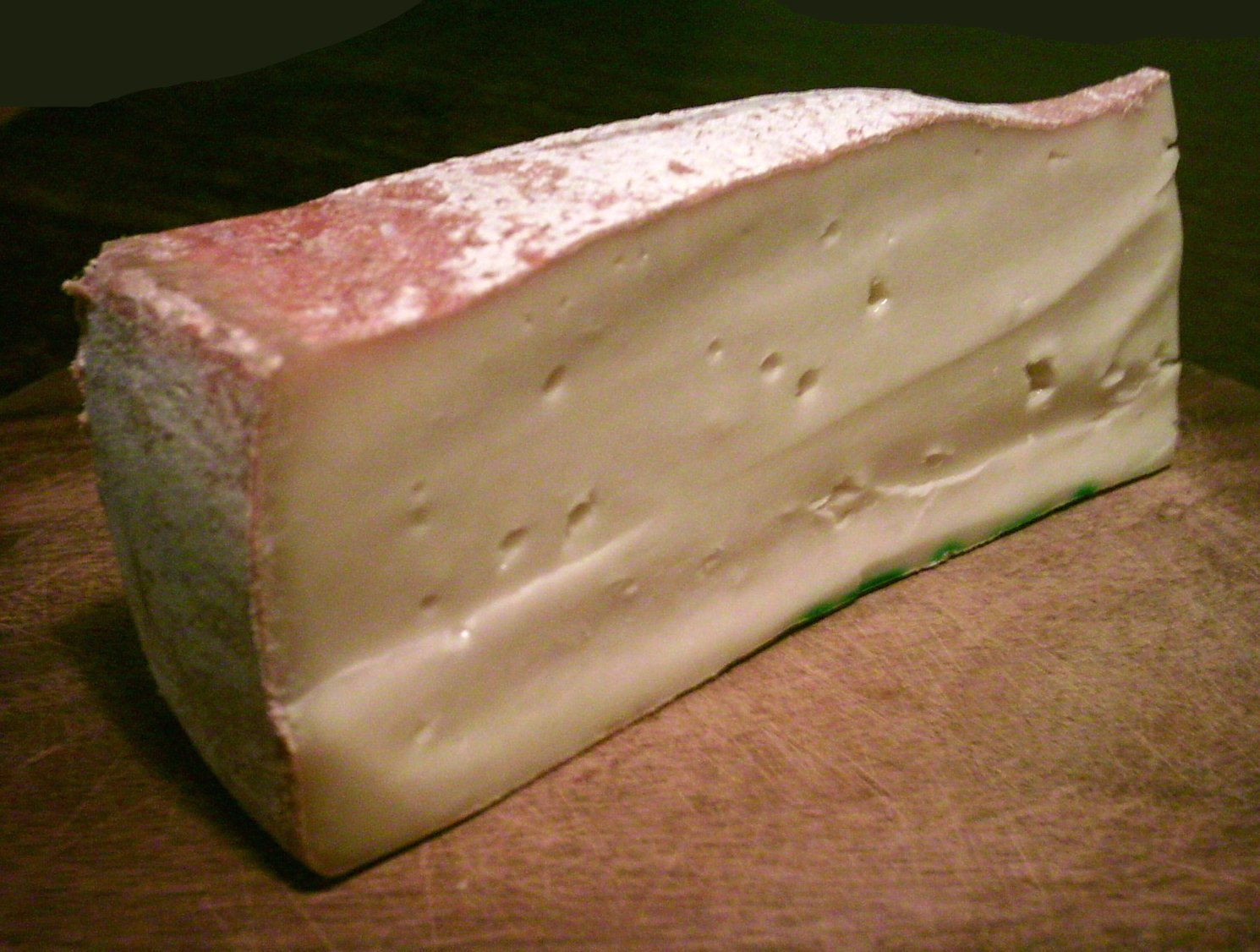
Fontina

- Fontina – DOP – Aosta Valley
- Formadi – Friuli-Venezia Giulia

- Formadi frant
- Formadi salat (also known as formaggio salato, and related to Asìno)

- Formaggella – Piedmont, Lombardy

- Formaggella del Bec – Lombardy
- Formaggella del Luinese
- Formaggella dell'Adamello
- Formaggella della Val Brembana
- Formaggella della Val Camonica
- Formaggela della Val di Sabbia
- Formaggella della Val di Scalve
- Formaggella della Val Seriana
- Formaggella della Val Trompia
- Formaggella di caglio – Piedmont
- Formaggella tremosine
- Formaggella uso monte
- Formaggella Valcavallina

- Formaggello spazzacamino – Val Vigezzo, Piedmont
- Formaggetta

- Formaggetta della Valle Argentina – Liguria
- Formaggetta di Bonassola – Liguria
- Formaggetta di mucca
- Formaggetta di Stella San Giovanni – Liguria
- Formaggetta savonese – Liguria

- Formaggina
- Formaggio

- Formaggio a crosta rossa
- Formaggio agordino di malga – Province of Belluno, Veneto
- Formaggio Alta Pusteria (see Hoch Pustertaler) – South Tyrol
- Formaggio Bastardo del Grappa – Veneto
- Formaggio caprino del Cilento – Campania
- Formaggio caprino della Limina – Province of Reggio Calabria, Calabria
- Formaggio coi vermi – Lombardy
- Formaggio caprino d'alpeggio – Piedmont
- Formaggio da spalmare
- Formaggio dei Zaccuni
- Formaggio d'alpeggio di Triora – Liguria
- Formaggio d'alpe – Piedmont
- Formaggio del cit – Friuli-Venezia Giulia
- Formaggio del Gleno – Lombardy
- Formaggio del fieno
- Formaggio del monte – South Tyrol
- Formaggio delle Langue o Trifulin – Piedmont
- Formaggio di capra

- Formaggio di capra di Calabria – Calabria

- Formaggio di "caso" – Piedmont
- Formaggio di colostro ovino – Sardinia
- Formaggio di Fossa – Emilia-Romagna, Marche
- Formaggio di malga dei 7 comuni – Veneto
- Formaggio di Menconico – Lombardy
- Formaggio di montagna

- Formaggio di montagna di Sesto – South Tyrol
- Formaggio di montagna friulano – Friuli-Venezia Giulia

- Formaggio fiore or Fiore sardo – Sardinia
- Formaggio in crema – Piedmont
- Formaggio marcio or casu marzu – Sardinia
- Formaggio pecorino di Atri – Abruzzo
- Formaggio Piave – Veneto
- Formaggio pressato – Lombardy
- Formaggio salato o Asino (synonym for Formadi salat) Friuli-Venezia Giulia
- Formaggio saltarello – Friuli-Venezia Giulia
- Formaggio di Santo Stefano di Quisquina – Sicily
- Formaggio semigrasso d'alpe – Lombardy
- Formaggio ubriaco – Friuli-Venezia Giulia
- Formaggio Val Seriana – Lombardy

- Formaggiola caprina – Emilia-Romagna
- Formaggiu ri capra

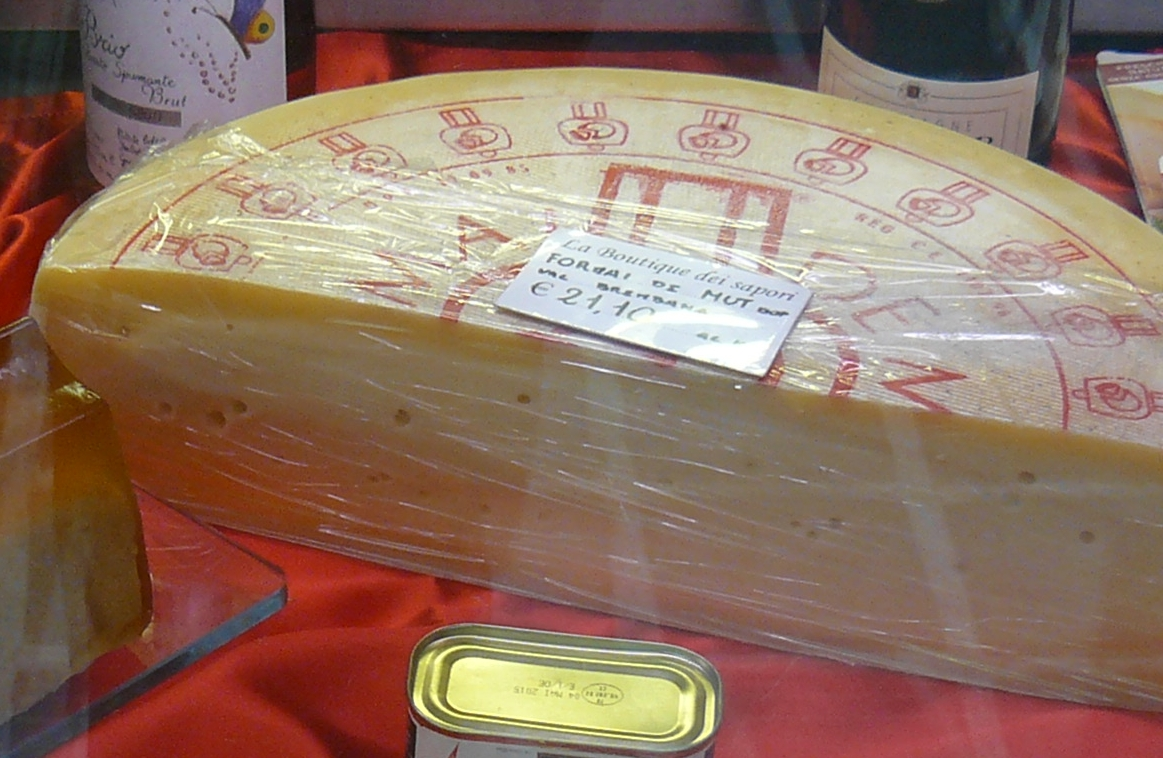
Formai de Mut dell'Alta Valle Brembana

- Formai

- Formai de Livign – Province of Sondrio, Lombardy
- Formai de Mut – Val Brembana, Lombardy

- Formai de Mut dell'Alta Valle Brembana – DOP – Lombardy

- Formaio embriago – Veneto
- Furmaggitt di Montevecchia – Lombardy
- Furmaggiu du quagliu – Calabria
- Furmai

- Furmai del sieur Mario – Lombardy
- Furmai marçèt – Lombardy

- Formazza – Piedmont
- Formella del Friuli – Friuli-Venezia Giulia
- Frachet – Piedmont
- Fresa – Sardinia
- Frico balacia – Friuli-Venezia Giulia
- Frue – Sardinia

== G ==
- Galbanino
- Garda Tremosine – Lombardy
- Giacobin de Zena
- Giganti – Basilicata
- Giglio sardo – Sardinia
- Gineprino – Umbria
- Gingherlino – Lombardy
- Giuncata – Liguria, Calabria, Sicily
- Gioda – Piedmont
- Gioddu – Sardinia
- Giuncà – Piedmont
- Gorga Ciccarelli Viareggio – Tuscany

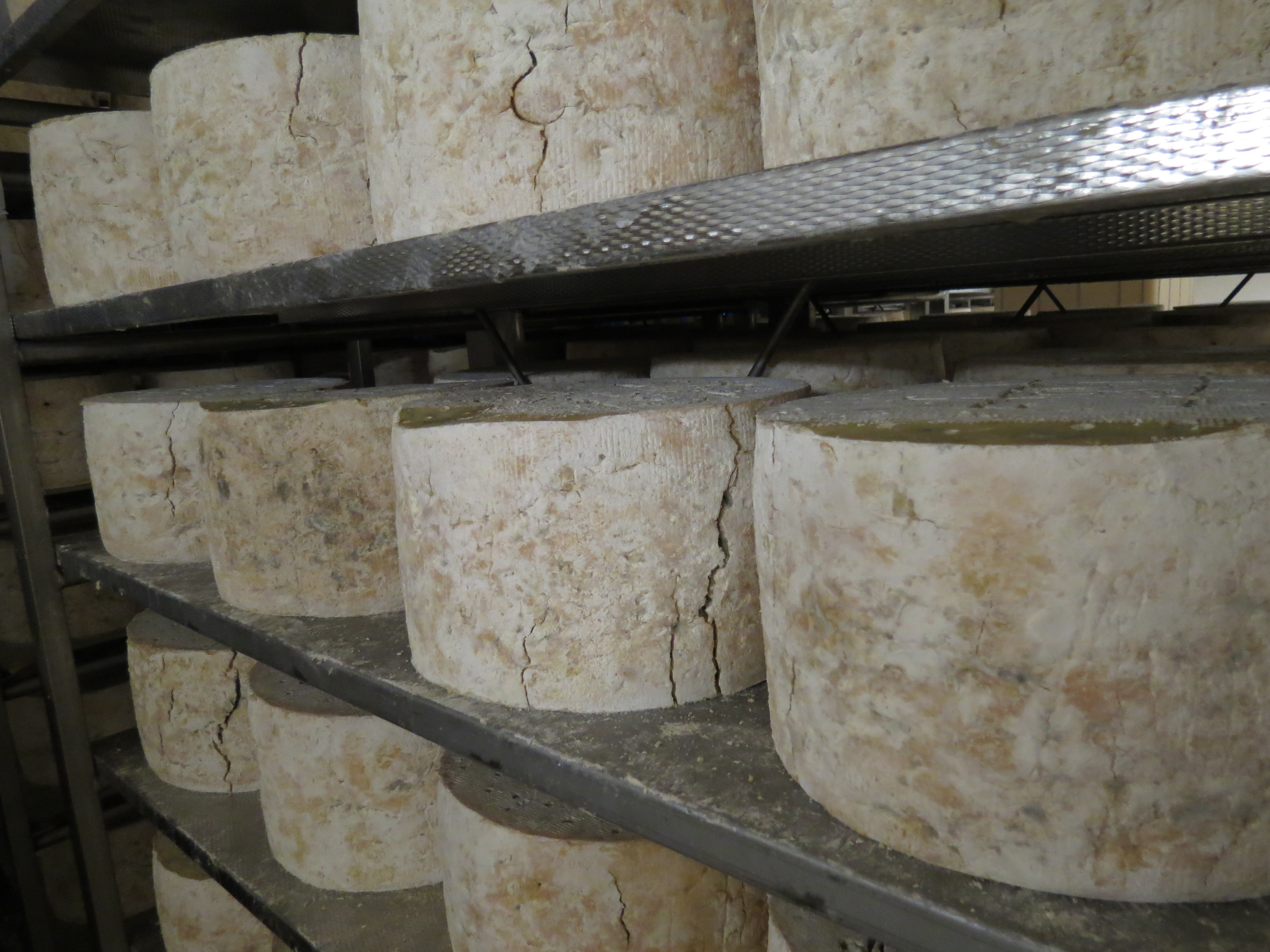
Gorgonzola aging

- Gorgonzola – DOP – Lombardy, Piedmont

- Gorgonzola a due paste
- Gorgonzola con la coda
- Gorgonzola bresciano – Lombardy
- Gorgonzola tipo piccante

- Gran cacio di Morolo – Morolo, Lazio
- Gran Cacio Etrusco – Lazio
- Grana – class of hard, mature cheeses

- Grana calabrese – Calabria
- Grana Padano – DOP – Lombardy, Piedmont, Trentino, Veneto, Emilia‑Romagna
- Grana Trentino – Trentino

- Grande Vecchio di Montefollonico – Tuscany
- Granone Lodigiano – Lombardy
- Grappino
- Grasso d'alpe – Piedmont
- Graukäse – South Tyrol

- Graukäse della Valle Aurina – South Tyrol

- Gresal – Veneto; the name used in Sedico for Pressato
- Groviera La Leonessa – Veneto
- Guttus di pecora grossetano – Tuscany

== H ==
- Hoch Pustertaler – South Tyrol; a cow's milk cheese, also known as formaggio Alta Pusteria; made in the communes of Toblach and Niederdorf

== I ==
- Incavolata – Piedmont; soft mixed milk cheese (such as robiola), wrapped in cabbage leaves
- Ircano – Sardinia; cheese made from goats' milk in the communes of San Nicolò Gerrei, Tertenia and Guspini
- Italico – Lombardy; cows' milk cheese made particularly in the provinces of Lodi and Pavia; a synonym for Bel Paese

== J ==
- Jasperino lombardo – Lombardy

== K ==
- Kiba torinese – Province of Turin, Piedmont

== L ==
- Lacarian
- Lagrein – South Tyrol
- La Res – Piedmont
- Latteria – Lombardy, Friuli-Venezia Giulia

- Latteria di Cividale – from Cividale, Province of Udine, Friuli-Venezia Giulia
- Latteria Delebio – Lombardy
- Latteria di Fagagna – from Fagagna, Province of Udine, Friuli-Venezia Giulia
- Latteria di Fontanafredda – from Fontanafredda, Province of Pordenone, Friuli-Venezia Giulia
- Latteria di Livigno – from Livigno, Valtellina, Lombardy

- Liptauer triestino – Province of Trieste, Friuli-Venezia Giulia

== M ==
- Macagn – Piedmont; mountain cows' milk cheese made in the province of Vercelli in the areas of Biella and the Valsesia
- Maccagno o Toma Maccagno – Lombardy
- Madonie Provola – Sicily; stretched curd cows' milk cheese made in the mountains of Madonie in the province of Palermo
- Maggot cheese – Sardinia
- Magnocca – Lombardy

- Maioc-Magnocca gordana – Lombardy

- Magnùn – Piedmont
- Magro di piatta – Lombardy
- Maiorchino – Sicily

- Maiorchino di Novara di Sicilia – Sicily

- Malga

- Malga altopina o dei Sette Comuni – Veneto
- Malga bellunese – Province of Belluno, Veneto
- Malga Fane – South Tyrol
- Malga o Ugovizza – Friuli-Venezia Giulia
- Malga stagionato nelle vinacce – South Tyrol
- Malga Stelvio – Lombardy, South Tyrol

- Manteca – Apulia, Campania, Molise, Basilicata
- Maria provolone di Potenza – Basilicata
- Marzolina – Lazio
- Marzolino – Tuscany

- Marzolino del Chianti – Tuscany
- Marzolino di Lucardo – Tuscany

- Marzotica – Province of Lecce, Apulia
- Mascarpin de la Calza – Lombardy
- Mascarpa – Lombardy
- Mascarpone – Lombardy

- Mascarpone di bufala – Campania
- Mascarpone di bufala di Battipaglia – Campania
- Mascarpone torta – Mascarpone layered with basil leaves and pine kernels

- Mattone or Zeigel – South Tyrol
- Mattonella al rosmarino
- Matusc o Magro di latteria – Lombardy
- Mezzapasta – Piedmont
- Millefoglie all'aceto balsamico or Marzemino – Veneto
- Misto

- Misto capra
- Misto capra di malga – Veneto
- Misto pecora fresco dei Berici – Veneto

- Moesin di Fregona – Veneto
- Mollana della Val Borbera – Liguria
- Moncenisio (see Murianengo) – Piedmont
- Montagna
- Montanello (Caciotta dolce) – Tuscany

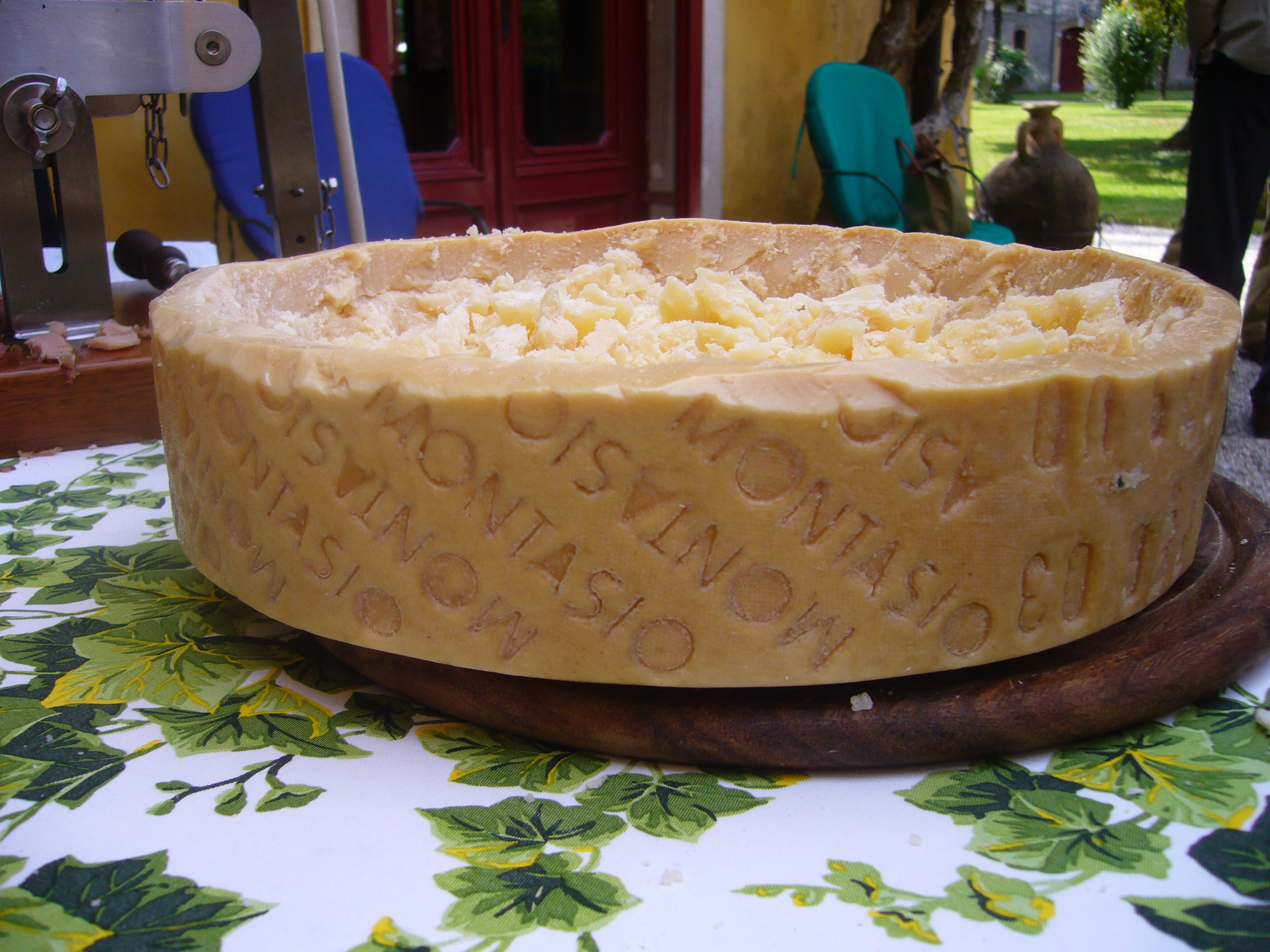
Montasio

- Montasio – DOP – Friuli‑Venezia Giulia, Veneto
- Monte Baldo – Trentino
- Monte Baldo primo fiore – Trentino
- Monte delle Dolomiti – Trentino
- Monte Veronese – DOP – Province of Verona, Veneto

- Monte Veronese di malga – Province of Verona, Veneto
- Monte Veronese ubriaco all'amarone – Province of Verona, Veneto

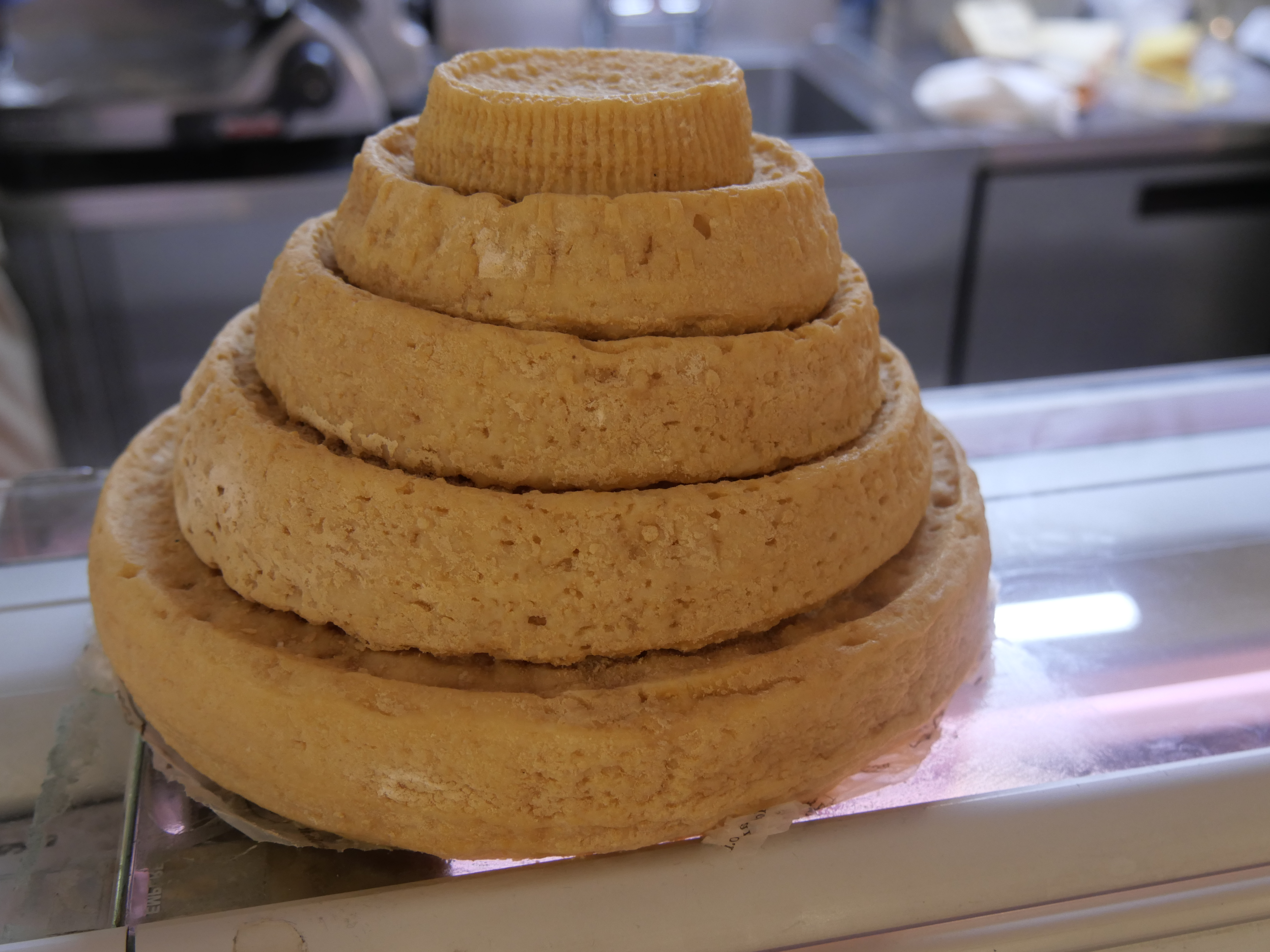
- Montebore
  Montébore – Piedmont; cheese made from mixed cows' and sheep's milk in the south-east of the (province of Alessandria) close to the Ligurian border, particularly in the area of Mongiardino Ligure
- Montegranero – Marche
- Morello – Tuscany; cheese made from ewe's milk with added live lactic cultures
- Morlâc – Veneto
- Morlacco (or Morlacco di Grappa) – area of Monte Grappa, Veneto
- Mortrett (Murtret) – Piedmont
- Mortaràt – Piedmont; class of cheeses from the area of Biella in which the curds are coated with natural flavourings such as alpine herbs, spices, walnuts, maize flour. Examples include Ostrica di montagna, Ciambella all'Aglio, Maccagnetta alle erbe, Maccagnetta alle noci, and Mattonella al rosmarino

- Mortaràt Ciambella aromatica – Piedmont

- Motelì – Val Camonica, Lombardy
- Motta – Piedmont
- Mottolina (historical name for Bettelmatt – Piedmont
- Mottolino – Piedmont

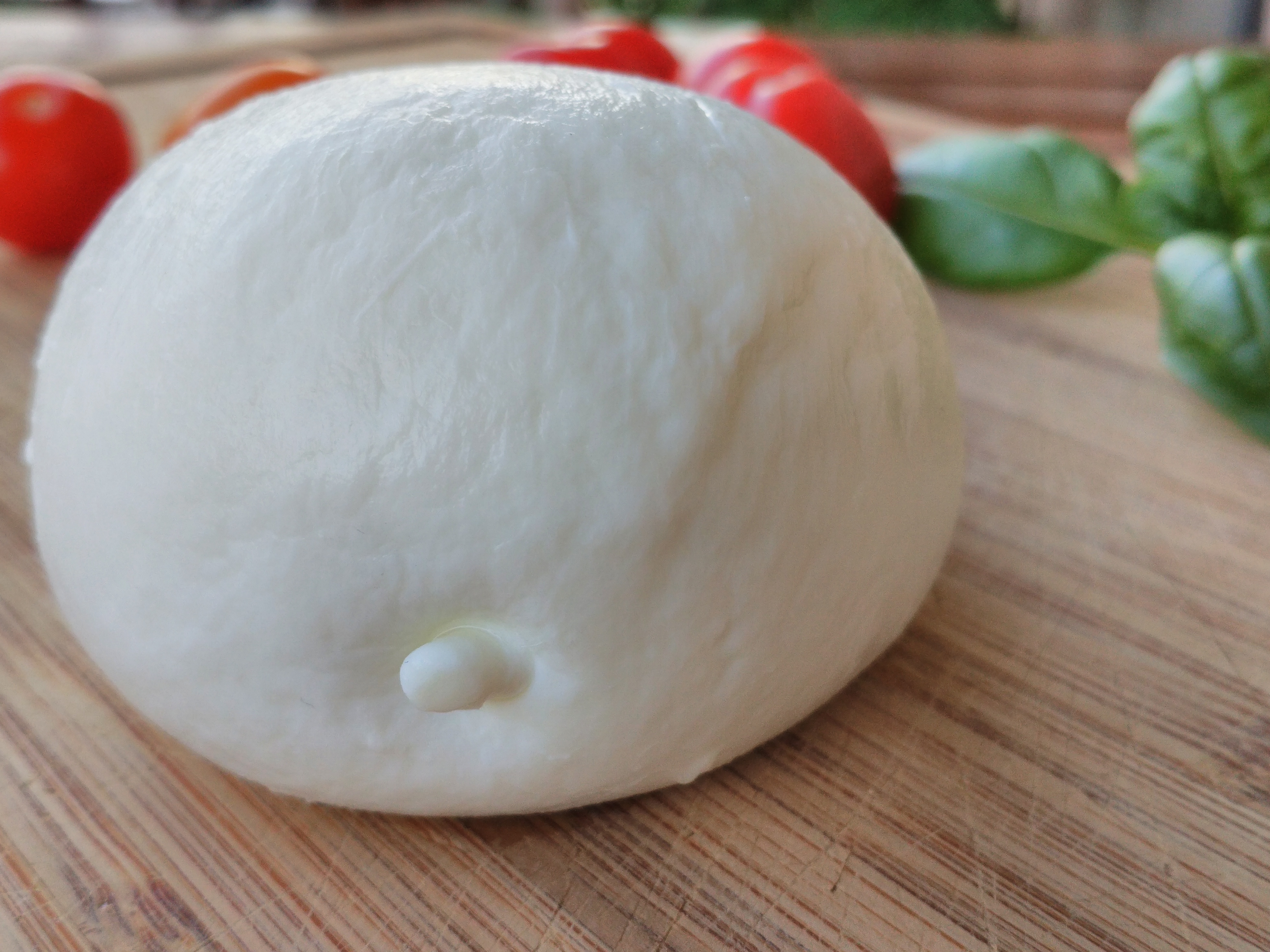
Mozzarella di bufala

- Mozzarella – Campania, provinces of Latina and Frosinone, Lazio, Apulia

- Mozzarella di bufala campana – DOP – Campania, Lazio, Apulia

- Murazzano – DOP – Piedmont
- Murianengo – Piedmont; also known as Moncenisio this is a Gorgonzola-like cows' milk cheese from the province of Turin.
- Mursin – Piedmont
- Murtarat – Piedmont
- Musulupu – Calabria
- Mustela – Sardinia

== N ==
- Nevègal – Veneto
- Nis – Emilia-Romagna
- Nocciolino di Ceva – Piedmont
- Nostrale d'alpe – Piedmont
- Nostrano (local produce)

- Nostrano di malga
- Nostrano d'alpe – Piedmont
- Nostrano de casèl – Trentino
- Nostrano del Primiero (see Nostrano della Val di Fassa) – Trentino
- Nostrano di Costalta – Trentino
- Nostrano di Crodo – Piedmont
- Nostrano di latteria – Piedmont
- Nostrano di malga trentino – Trentino
- Nostrano Fiavè – Trentino
- Nostrano grasso – Lombardy
- Nostrano misto capra – Trentino
- Nostrano prealpino – Veneto
- Nostrano semigrasso – Trentino
- Nostrano della Val di Fassa – Trentino
- Nostrano Valchiese – Trentino
- Nostrano Valtrompia DOP – Lombardy

- Nusnetto bresciano – Province of Brescia, Lombardy

== O ==
- Ol Sciür – Lombardy
- Ormea – Piedmont
- Orrengigo di Pistoia – Tuscany
- Ortler – South Tyrol
- Ostrica di montagna – Piedmont; one of the Mortaràt specialities of the area of Biella
- Ossolano d'alpe – Piedmont; cows' milk cheese

== P ==
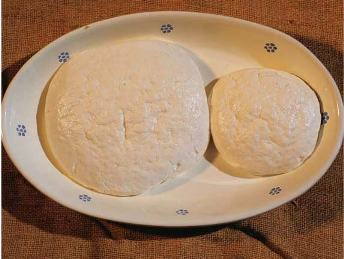
Padraccio

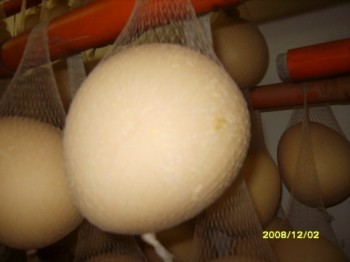
The characteristic shape of the Pallone di Gravina aged for 4 months

- Paddaccio – Basilicata, Calabria
- Padraccio – Basilicata
- Padduni – Sicily
- Paglierina – Piedmont

- Paglierina appassita
- Paglierina di rifreddo – Piedmont

- Paglietta – Piedmont

- Paglietta delle Langhe – Piedmont
- Paglietta piemontese – Piedmont

- Pallone di Gravina – Apulia and Basilicata
- Pampanella – Abruzzo, Apulia
- Pancette – Basilicata
- Pannarello – Friuli-Venezia Giulia, Trentino
- Pannerone Lodigiano – Lombardy

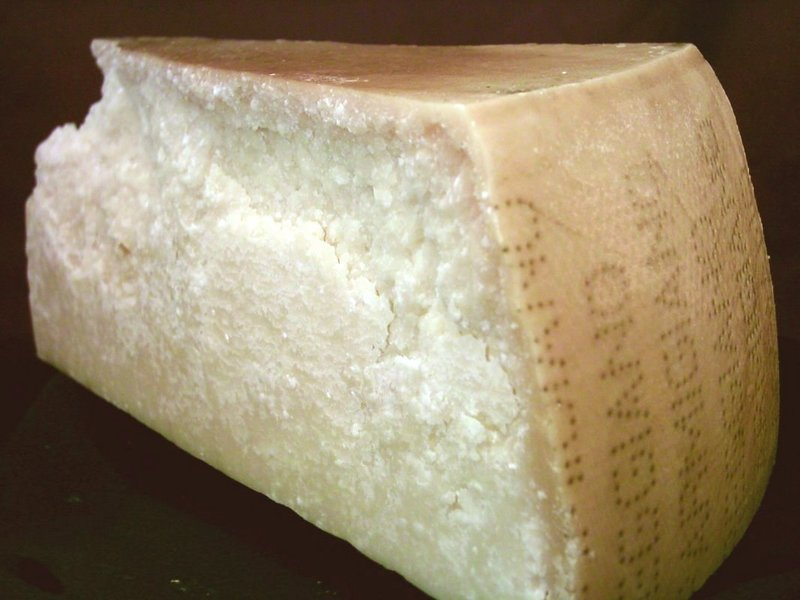
Parmigiano Reggiano

- Parmigiano Reggiano – DOP – Emilia-Romagna, Lombardy
- Pastore
- Pastorella del Cerreto di Sorano – Tuscany
- Pastorino – Sardinia
- Pecora
- Pecoricco – Apulia
- Pecorini – Calabria
- Pecorino – sheep's-milk cheese

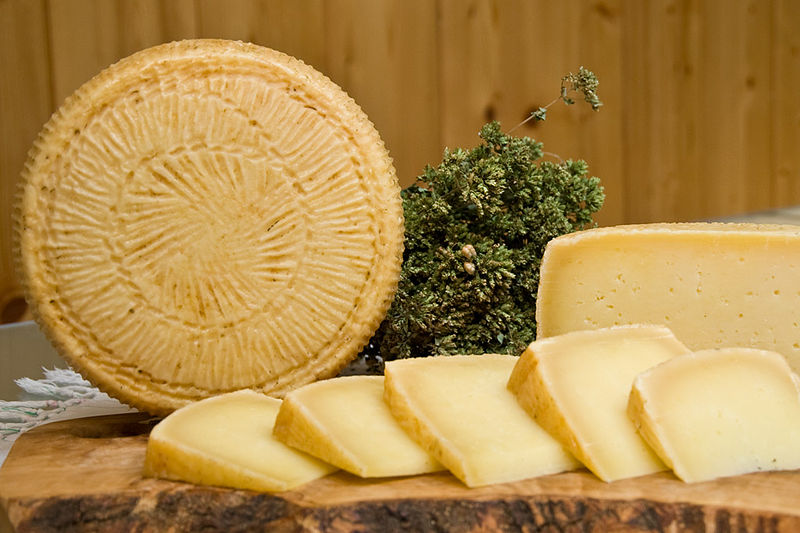
Pecorino di Filiano

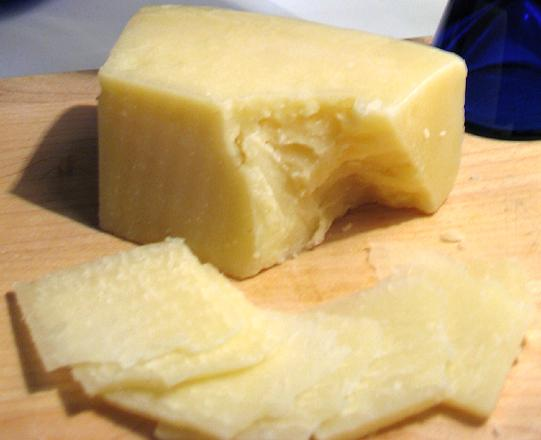
Pecorino romano

- Pecorino a crosta fiorita – Tuscany
- Pecorino baccellone – Tuscany
- Pecorino bagnolese – Piedmont
- Pecorino brindisino – Province of Brindisi, Apulia
- Pecorino d'Abruzzo – Abruzzo
- Pecorino dei Berici – Veneto
- Pecorino del Casentino – Tuscany
- Pecorino del Parco di Migliarino-San Rossore – Tuscany
- Pecorino della costa apuana – Liguria
- Pecorino della Garfagnana – Tuscany
- Pecorino della Lunigiana – Tuscany
- Pecorino della Versilia – Tuscany
- Pecorino delle balze volterrane – Tuscany
- Pecorino di Amatrice – Lazio
- Pecorino di Carmasciano – Campania
- Pecorino di Farindola – Abruzzo
- Pecorino di Filiano – hard pecorino from the Province of Potenza, Basilicata, for which an application for PDO status was published in the Official Journal of the European Union on 19.4.2007
- Pecorino di Garfagnina – a Tuscan pecorino made with milk from Garfagnina Bianca ewes
- Pecorino di Moliterno – Basilicata
- Pecorino di montagna
- Pecorino di Osilo – Sardinia
- Pecorino di Pian di Vas – Friuli-Venezia Giulia
- Pecorino di Pienza stagionato – Tuscany
- Pecorino di Romagna – Emilia-Romagna
- Pecorino fiorone – Lombardy
- Pecorino foggiano – Province of Foggia, Apulia
- Pecorino leccese – Province of Lecce, Apulia
- Pecorino lucano – Basilicata
- Pecorino Monte Re – Friuli-Venezia Giulia
- Pecorino romano – DOP – Lazio, Tuscany, Sardinia
- Pecorino rosso volterrano – Tuscany
- Pecorino sardo – DOP – Sardinia
- Pecorino senese – Siena, Tuscany
- Pecorino siciliano – DOP – Sicily
- Pecorino stagionato in foglie di noce
- Pecorino Subasio (an alternative name [in dialect] for Pecorino umbro)
- Pecorino toscano – DOP – Tuscany
- Pecorino umbro – Umbria
- Pecorino veneto – Veneto

- Pepato
- Peretta – Sardinia
- Perlagrigia sottocenere – Veneto
- Perlanera – Sardinia
- Pettirosso "Tipo Norcia" – Tuscany
- Piacentinu or Piacentino
- Piacentinu di Enna or Piacentino ennese – Sicily
- Piattone – Valtellina, Lombardy
- Piave – DOP – Veneto

- Piave Fresco
- Piave Mezzano
- Piave Vecchio
- Piave Vecchio Selezione Oro
- Piave Vecchio Riserva

- Piddiato – Sicily
- Pierino – Piedmont
- Pioda Santa Maria – Piedmont
- Piodino – Piedmont
- Piramide – Piedmont

- Piramide di capra
- Piramide in foglia

- Piscedda – Sardinia
- Pirittas – Sardinia
- Pojna enfumegada (see Poina enfumegada) – Trentino
- Poina enfumegada – Trentino
- Pratolina – Tuscany
- Pressato – Veneto
- Presolana-Valseriana – Lombardy
- Prescinseua – Liguria
- Primo sale – Sicily
- Primolino – Piedmont
- Primusali – Sicily
- Provatura – Lazio
- Provola

- Provola affumicata – smoked cow's milk cheese from Campania

- Provola affumicata di bufala – smoked water buffalo's-milk cheese from Campania

- Provola di bufala – water buffalo's-milk cheese from Lazio: provinces of Rome and Frosinone
- Provola affumicata di bufala – smoked water buffalo's-milk cheese from Lazio: provinces of Rome and Frosinone
- Provola Capizzi – Sicily
- Provula casale (Floresta) – Sicily
- Provola dei Monti Sicani – Sicily
- Provola dei Nebrodi – Sicily
- Provola delle Madonie – Sicily
- Provola ragusana – Sicily
- Provola siciliana – Sicily
- Provola silana – Calabria

- Provole – Basilicata

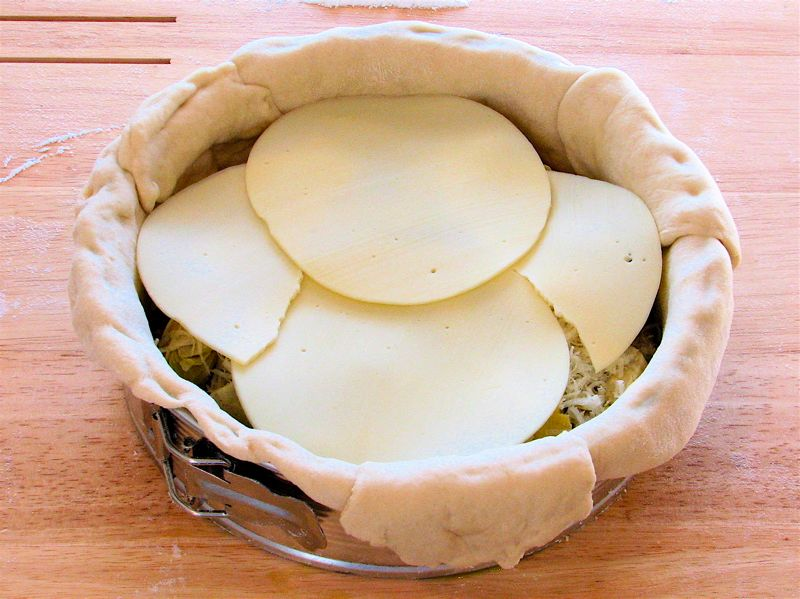
Sliced provolone

- Provolone

- Provolone del Monaco – Campania
- Provolone piccante – Lombardy, Veneto
- Provolone sardo – Sardinia
- Provolone siciliano – Sicily
- Provolone Valpadana – DOP – Lombardy, Veneto, Emilia-Romagna, Trentino
- Provolone Vernengo – Lombardy, Emilia-Romagna, Veneto, Trentino

- Pusteria – South Tyrol
- Pustertaler – South Tyrol
- Puzzone

- Puzzone Bochiotti
- Puzzone di Moena – Trentino
- Puzzone Vandercaro

== Q ==
- Quadro

- Quadro di capra
- Quadro provenzale

- Quagliata ligure – Liguria
- Quartirolo Lombardo – DOP – Lombardy

== R ==
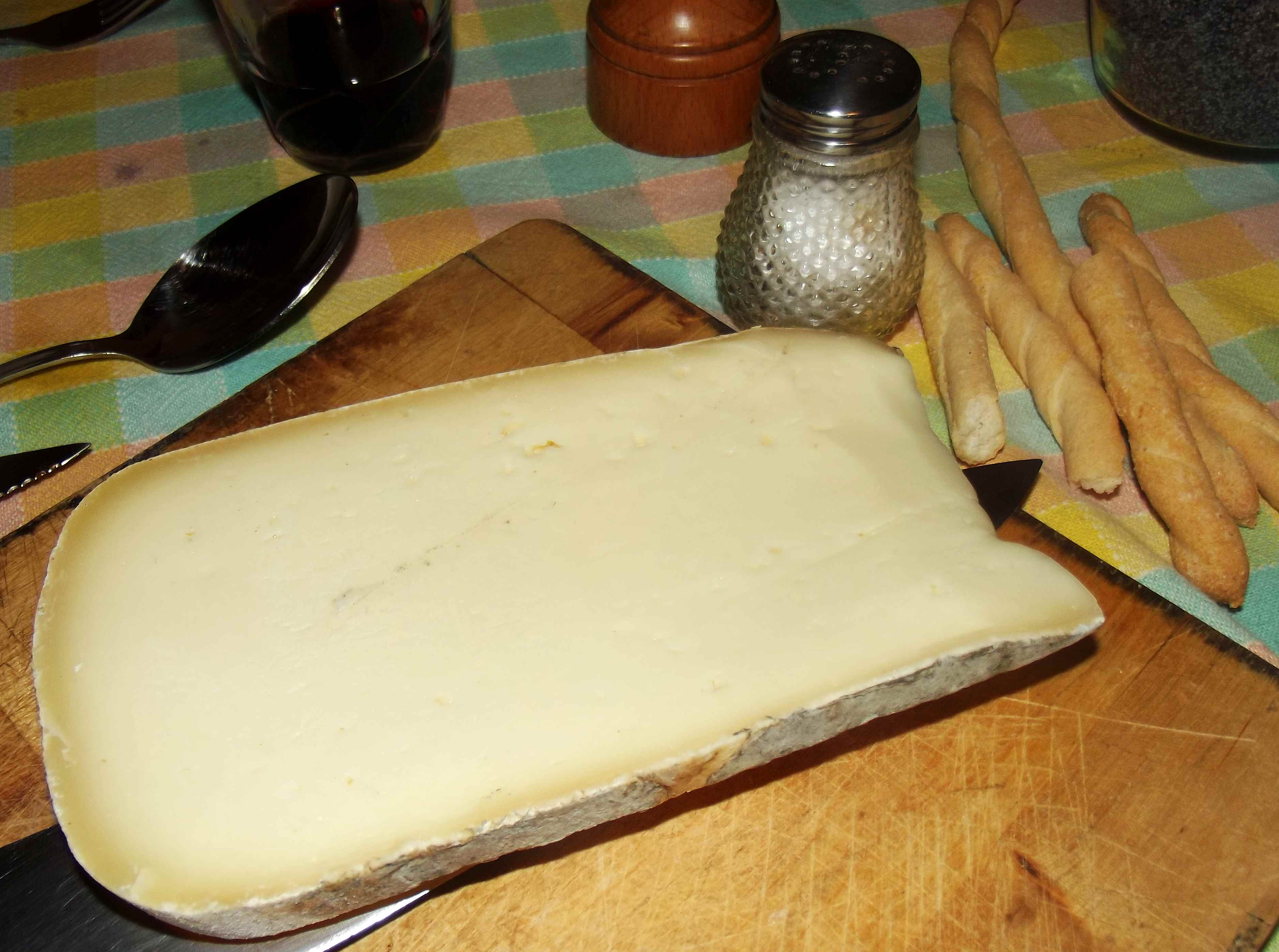
Raschera

- Raschera – DOP – Piedmont

- Raschera d'alpeggio – Piedmont; a Raschera, made at least 900m above sea level in certain Alpine areas of the province of Cuneo

- Ragusano – DOP – Sicily;
- Rasco – Calabria
- Raspadüra
- Ravaggiolo romagnolo – Emilia-Romagna
- Raveggiolo – Tuscany
- Raviggiolo – Tuscany, Emilia-Romagna

- Raviggiolo di pecora

- Raviggiolu – Sardinia
- Reblec de crama – Aosta Valley; cow's milk
- Réblèque – Aosta Valley; cow's milk
- Reblo

- Reblò alpino (see Reblochon)
- Reblo cremoso della Val di Susa – Piedmont

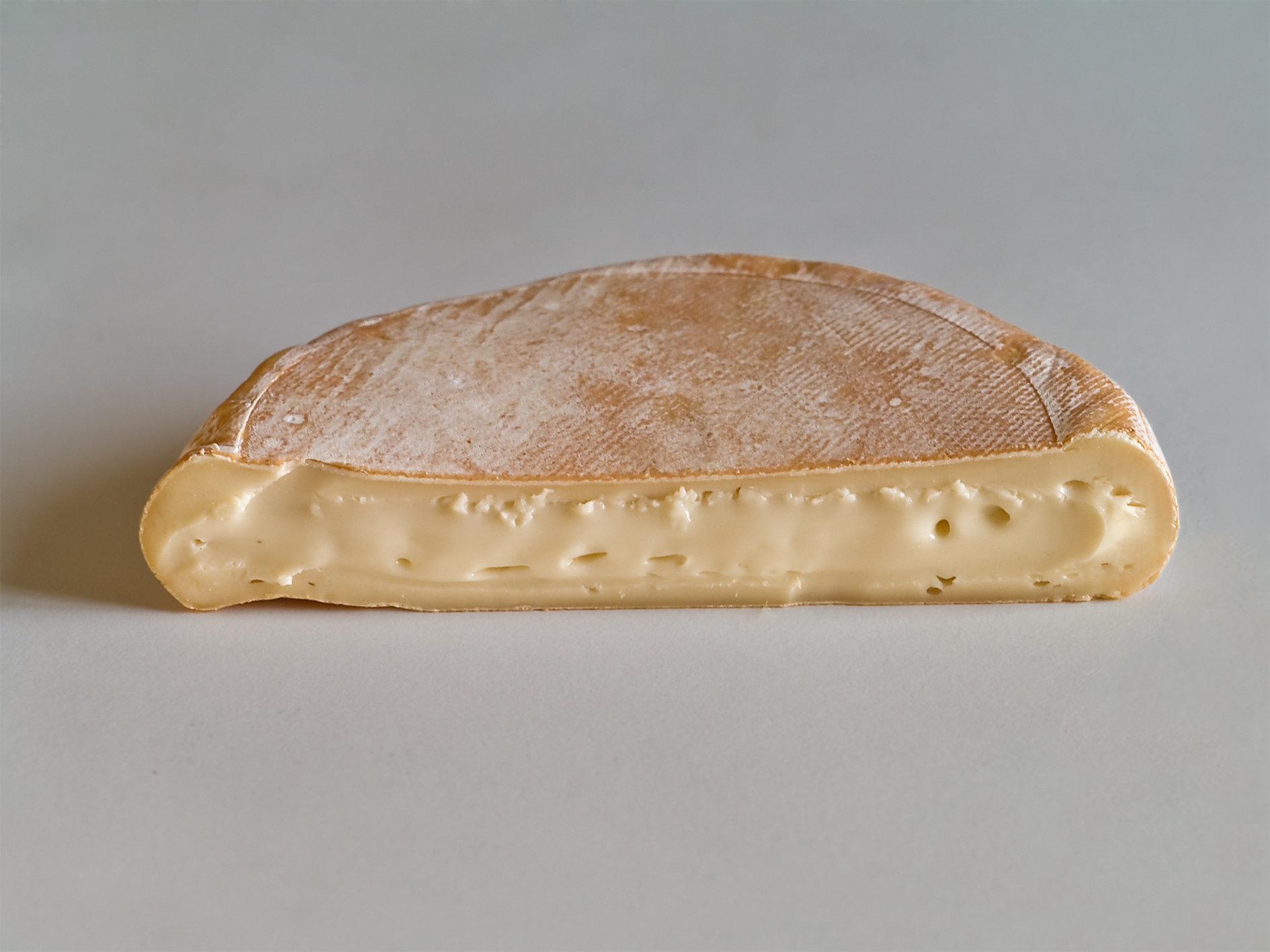
Reblochon

- Reblochon – Piedmont
- Rebruchon (see Reblochon)
- Regato
- Renàz – Veneto
- Riavulillo – Campania

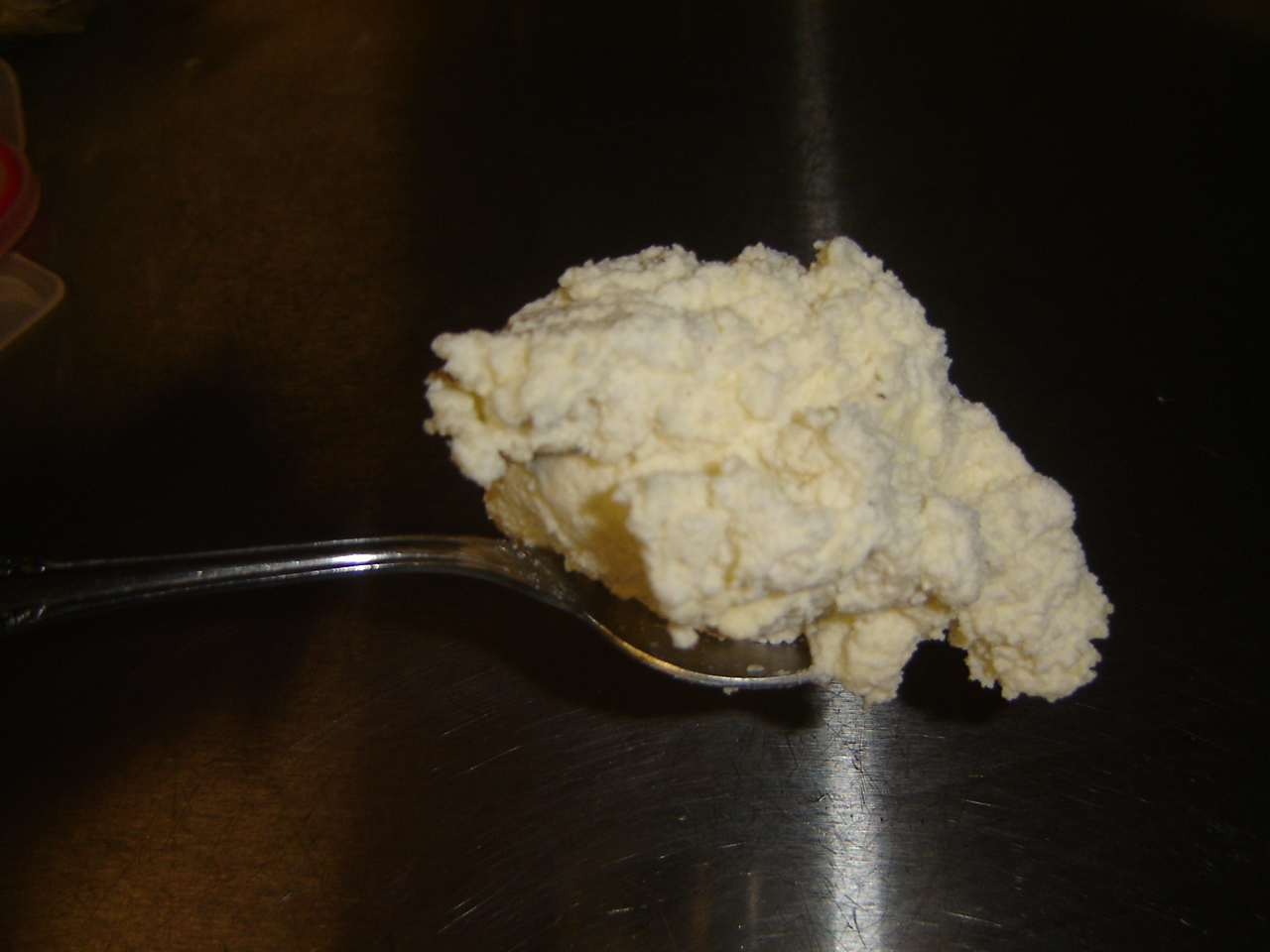
Ricotta

- Ricotta

- Ricotta affumicata di Mammola – Calabria
- Ricotta caprina friulana – Friuli-Venezia Giulia
- Ricotta di bufala

- Ricotta di bufala affumicata
- Ricotta di bufala infornata
- Ricotta di bufala salata
- Ricotta essiccata di bufala
- Ricotta fresca di bufala

- Ricotta di fuscella – Campania
- Ricotta forte – Campania
- Ricotta gentile – Sardinia
- Ricotta moliterna – Sardinia
- Ricotta mustia – Sardinia
- Ricotta pecorina Monte Re – Friuli-Venezia Giulia
- Ricotta romana – DOP – Lazio
- Ricotta salata^{,}^{,}
- Ricotta siciliana – Sicily
- Ricotta vaccina affumicata ossolana – Piedmont
- Ricotta forte – Apulia

- Rigatino di Castel San Pietro – Emilia-Romagna

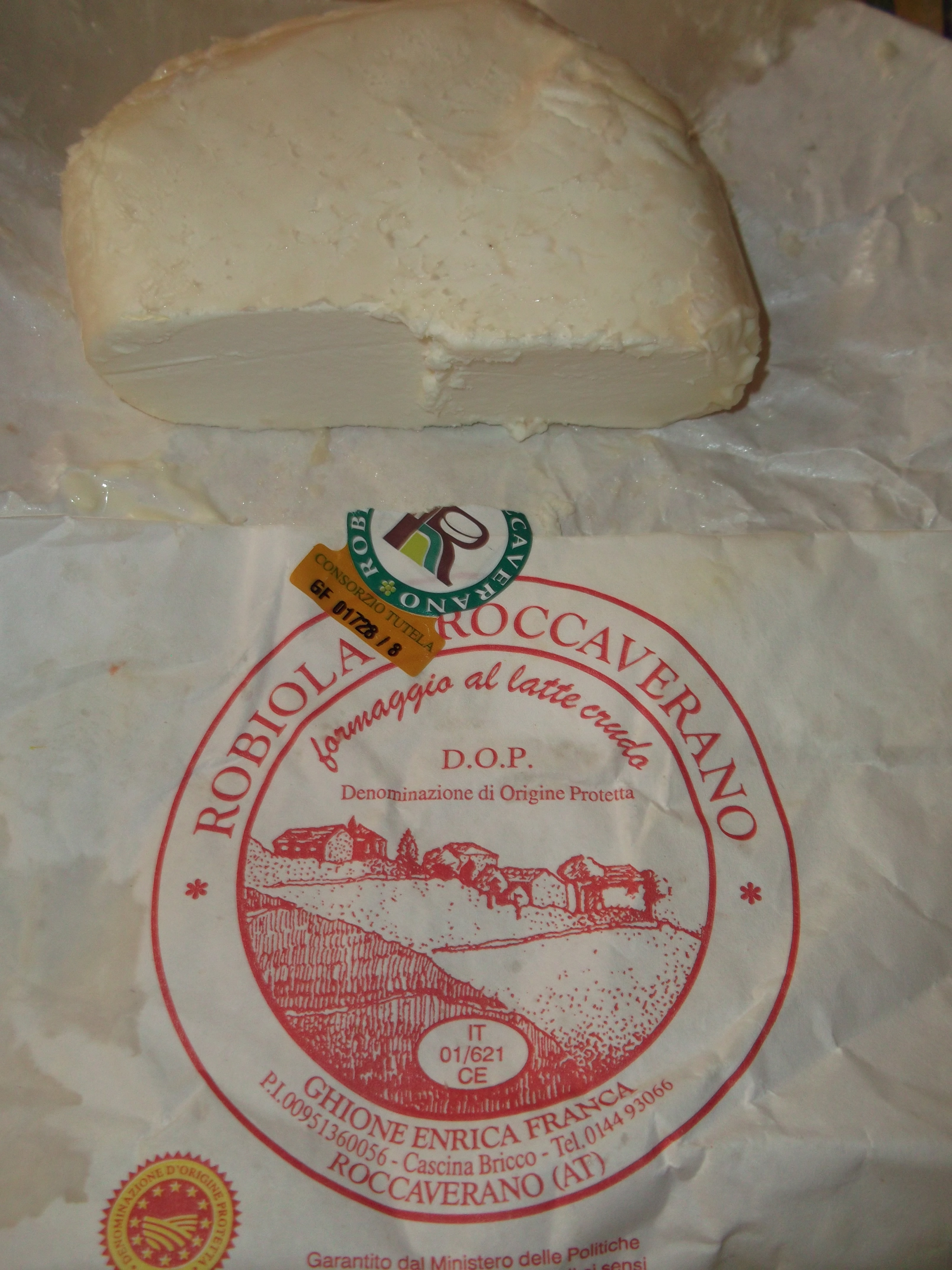
Robiola

- Robiola

- Robiola Alta Langa – Piedmont
- Robiola bresciana – Lombardy
- Robiola Cavour – Piedmont
- Robiola contadina – Piedmont
- Robiola d'Alba al tartufo – Piedmont
- Robiola della nonna
- Robiola della Val Bormida – Liguria
- Robiola della Valsassina – Lombardy
- Robiola delle Langhe – Piedmont
- Robiola di Bossolasco – Piedmont
- Robiola di Castel San Giovanni – Emilia-Romagna
- Robiola di Ceva o Mondovì – Piedmont
- Robiola di Cocconato – Piedmont
- Robiola di Introbio – Lombardy
- Robiola di Montevecchia – Lombardy
- Robiola di pecora
- Robiola di Roccaverano – DOP – Piedmont
- Robiola di serosa
- Robiola La Rustica – Lombardy
- Robiola piemontese classica – Piedmont

- Romita piemontese – Piedmont
- Rosa Camuna – Val Camonica, Lombardy; mild compact paste cheese made with partially skimmed cow's milk
- Rosso di lago – Piedmont

== S ==
- Salignon – lower Aosta Valley; goats' and/or sheep's milk cheese, usually smoked
- Salagnun – Piedmont
- Salato

- Salato duro friulano – Friuli-Venezia Giulia
- Salato morbido del Friuli – Friuli-Venezia Giulia

- Salgnun or Salignun) – Lombardy
- Salondro or Solandro – Trentino

- Salondro di malga
- Salondro magro

- Salva – Lombardy
- Santo Stefano d'Aveto (also known as San Stè) – from the upper Aveto valley and particularly from within the municipal boundaries of the comuni of Rezzoaglio and Santo Stefano d'Aveto, Liguria
- Sappada – Province of Belluno, Veneto
- Saras del Fèn – Piedmont
- Sarasso – Liguria
- Sarazzu (see: Sarasso) – Liguria
- Sargnon or Serniun – Piedmont
- Sbrinz – Lombardy
- Scacciata
- Scacione or Caprone – Lazio

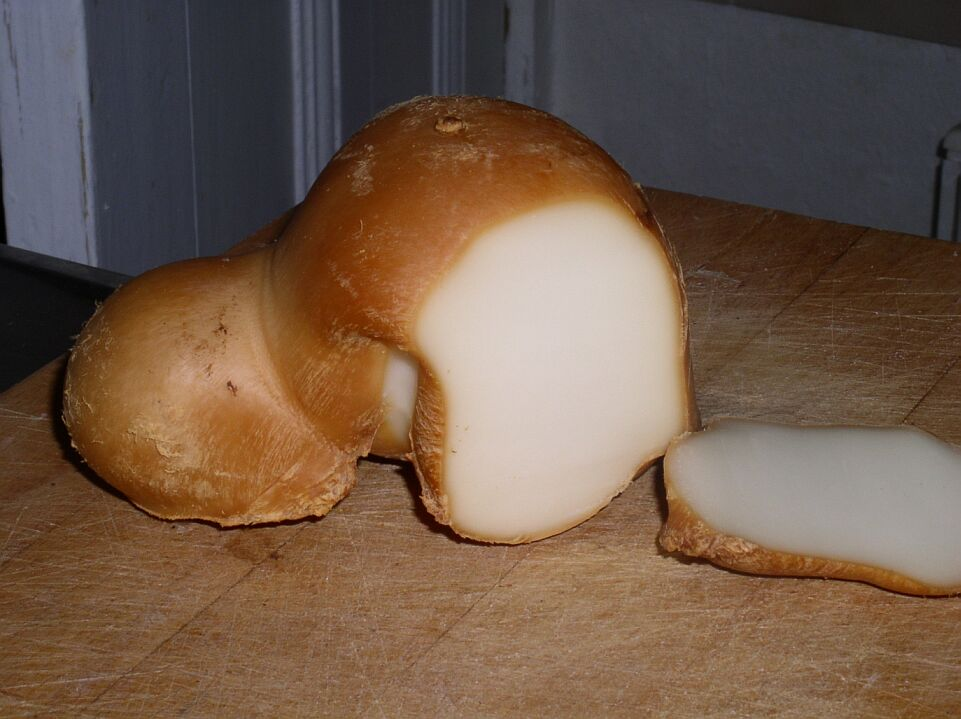
Smoked scamorza

- Scamorza

- Scamorza calabra – Calabria
- Scamorza di bufala – Campania
- Scamorza molisana – Molise

- Scheggia – Umbria
- Schiz – Veneto
- Schlander – South Tyrol
- Scuete frante – Friuli-Venezia Giulia
- Scuete fumade or Ricotta affumicata – Friuli-Venezia Giulia
- Scimuda d'alpe – Lombardy
- Scimudin – Lombardy
- Scimut – Lombardy
- Scodellato
- Secondo sale – Sicily
- Seras – lower Aosta Valley; cows' milk cheese known since 1267 and often eaten with polenta
- Seré (see: Seras) – Aosta Valley
- Seirass – Piedmont

- Seirass del Fen (see Seras) – Piedmont
- Seirass del Lausun – Piedmont
- Seirass di latte – Piedmont
- Seirass di siero di pecora
- Seirass stagionato

- Semicotto – Sardinia

- Semicotto caprino – Sardinia
- Semicotto ovino – Sardinia

- Semitenero di Loiano – Emilia-Romagna
- Semuda – Lombardy
- Sigarot – Piedmont

- Sigarot cenese
- Sigarot miele – Piedmont
- Sigarot naturale – Piedmont

- Silandro – South Tyrol
- Silter – Lombardy

- Silter della Val Camonica – Lombardy

- Shtalp – Calabria
- Soera (Sola della Valcasotto) – Piedmont
- Sola – Piedmont

- Sola stagionata – Piedmont

- Sora – Piedmont

- Sora di pecora brigasca – Piedmont
- Sora tre latti – Piedmont

- Sot la Trape – Friuli-Venezia Giulia

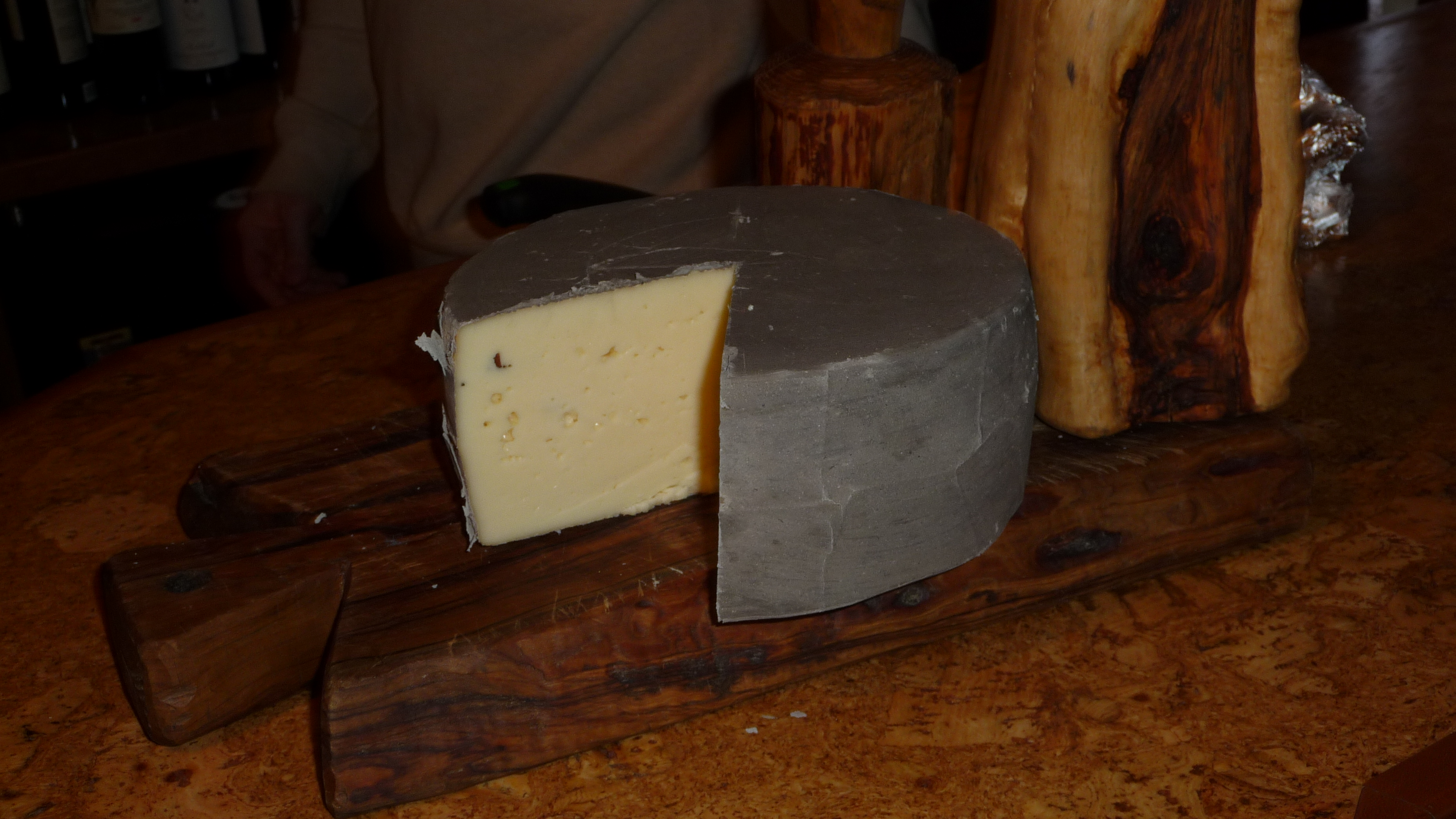
Sottocenere al tartufo

- Sottocenere al tartufo – Veneto
- Spalèm – Lombardy
- Spessa – Trentino
- Spress – Piedmont
- Spressa delle Giudicarie – DOP – Trentino
- Squacquerone di Romagna DOP – Emilia-Romagna
- Squarquaglione dei Monti Lepini – Lazio
- Sta'el – Lombardy
- Stagionato de Vaise – Liguria
- Stella di mare
- Stelvio or Stilfser – DOP – South Tyrol
- Sterzinger – South Tyrol
- Stintino di Luino – Lombardy

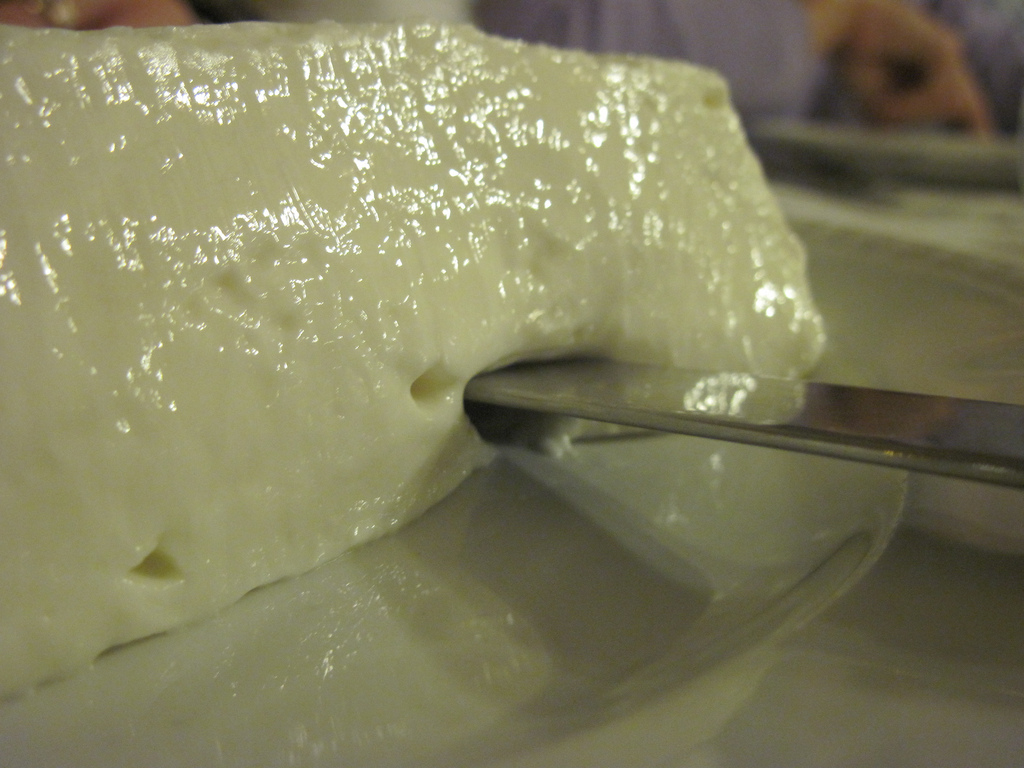
Stracchino

- Stracchino

- Stracchino della Valsassina – Lombardy
- Stracchino di bufala
- Stracchino di Nesso – Lombardy
- Stracchino nostrano di Monte Bronzone – Lombardy
- Stracchino orobico – Lombardy
- Stracchino tipico – Lombardy
- Stracchino toscano – Tuscany

- Stracciata – Molise
- Stracciatella di bufala – Apulia
- Strachet – Lombardy
- Strachitunt – Lombardy
- Stracòn – Veneto
- Strica – Molise

== T ==
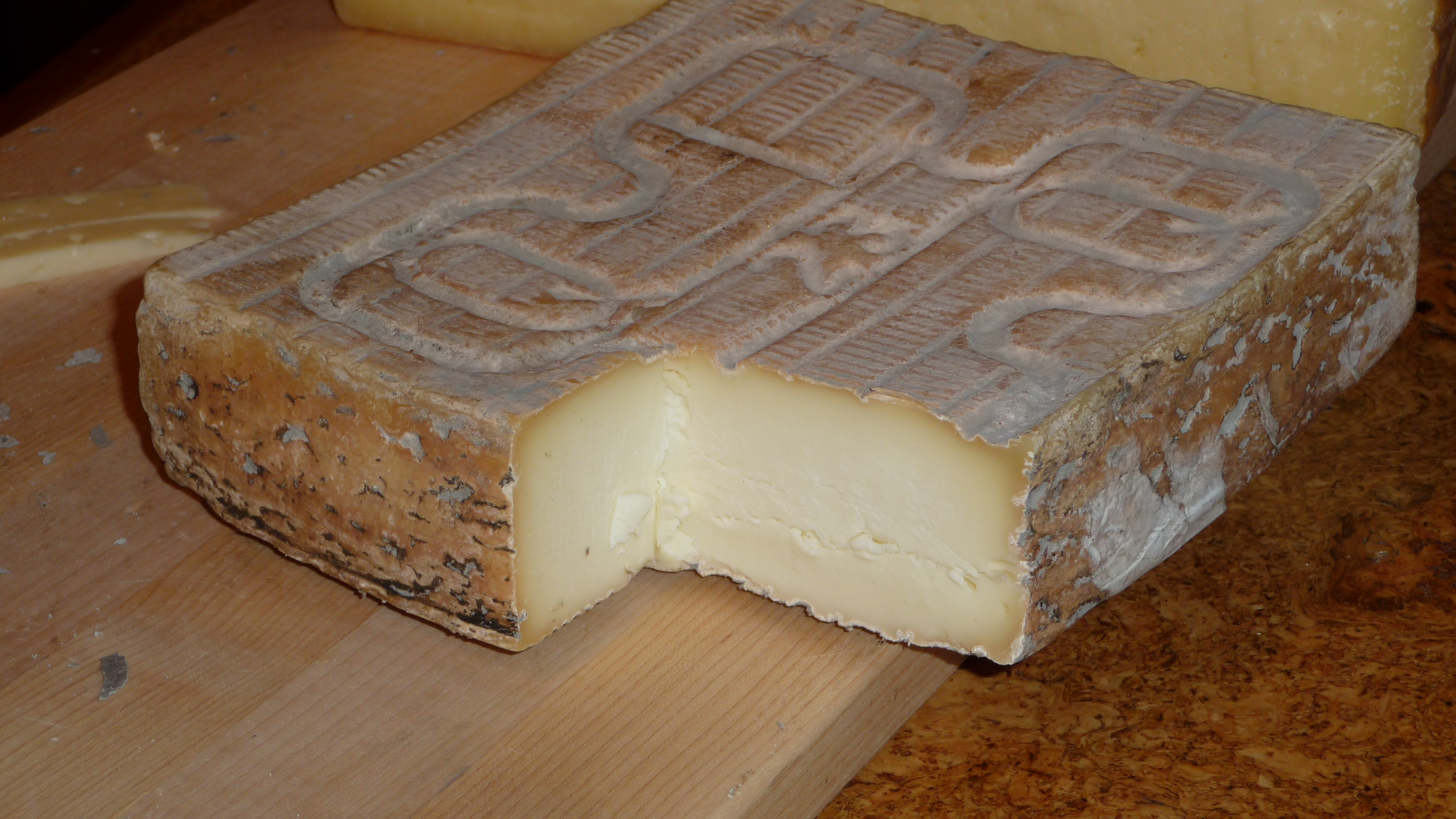
Taleggio

- Tabor – Province of Trieste, Friuli-Venezia Giulia
- Taburet – Piedmont
- Taleggio – DOP – Lombardy, Veneto and Piedmont

- Taleggio bergamasco – Lombardy
- Taleggio Mandello Lario – Lombardy

- Tella Alto Adige – South Tyrol
- Tendaio – semi-soft cows milk cheese made in Castiglione di Garfagnana, Tuscany, with ancient origins
- Testùn – Piedmont

- Testùn ciuc – Piedmont

- Tipo

- Tipo dolce – Lombardy
- Tipo fresco – Piedmont
- Tipo malga friulano – Friuli-Venezia Giulia
- Tipo stagionato – Piedmont

- Tirabuscion
- Tirolese – South Tyrol
- Toblach or Toblacher Stangenkäse – South Tyrol (see: Dobbiaco)
- Toma

- Toma Ajgra – from the Valsesia in the Province of Vercelli, Piedmont
- Toma alpigiana – Piedmont
- Toma biellese – made with milk from the Pezzata Rossa d'Oropa cattle breed in the Province of Biella, Piedmont
- Toma brusca – Piedmont
- Toma dal bot – Piedmont
- Toma del lait brusc (or Formag lait brusc) – cows' milk cheese from the Susa Valley, Piedmont – Piedmont
- Toma del Maccagno – cows' milk cheese from the Biellese, Piedmont
- Toma del Mottarone – Piedmont
- Toma del Pastore – Piedmont
- Toma della Basilicata
- Toma della Valle di Susa – cows' milk cheese from the Province of Turin, Piedmont
- Toma della Valle Stura – Province of Cuneo, Piedmont
- Toma della Valsesia – Province of Vercelli, Piedmont
- Toma di Balme – Piedmont
- Toma di Boves – Piedmont
- Toma di capra – Piedmont, Lombardy

- Toma di capra d'alpeggio – Piedmont
- Toma di capra o crava – Piedmont

- Toma di Celle – from the area around Celle Macra in the Valle Maira, Piedmont
- Toma di Elva (synonym for Casale de Elva) – Piedmont
- Toma of Gressoney – Aosta Valley (French: Tomme de Gressoney, Titsch: Kesch) – Lys Valley, Aosta Valley; a Toma made with cows' milk in the Alpine summer pastures of the Lys Valley
- Toma di Lanzo – Piedmont
- Toma di Mendatica – Liguria, from the upper Valle Arroscia, the Val Roja, and the Valle Imperia
- Toma ossolana – Piedmont

- Toma ossolana al prunent – Piedmont
- Toma ossolana d'alpeggio – Piedmont
- Toma ossolana di casa – Piedmont

- Toma ovicaprina – Piedmont
- Toma di Pragelato – Piedmont
- Toma di Valgrisenche – Valgrisenche, Aosta Valley (French: Tomme de Valgrisenche) – Valgrisenche, Aosta Valley
- Toma lucana – Basilicata
- Toma piemontese – Piedmont; DOP cheese produced in the provinces of Novara, Verbania, Vercelli, Biella, Turin and Cuneo and in parts of the provinces of Asti and Alessandria
- Toma Val Pelice – Province of Turin, Piedmont

- Tombea – Lombardy
- Tometta – Piedmont

- Tometta al Barolo – Piedmont
- Tometta di Barge – Barge, Piedmont
- Tometta Monte Ciuc
- Tometta Valle Elvo – Valle dell'Elvo, Piedmont

- Tometto (Tumet) – Piedmont
- Tomini di Bollengo e del Talucco – Piedmont
- Tomino – Piedmont

- Tomino canavesano asciutto – Canavese, Piedmont
- Tomino canavesano fresco – Canavese, Piedmont
- Tomino da padella – Piedmont
- Tomino del bec – Piedmont
- Tomino del boscaiolo – Piedmont
- Tomino del Bot – Province of Cuneo, Piedmont
- Tomino del mel – Val Varaita, Province of Cuneo, Piedmont
- Tomino del Talucco – Talucco, Piedmont
- Tomino delle Valli Saluzzesi – Province of Cuneo, Piedmont
- Tomino di Andrate – Andrate, Piedmont
- Tomino di Bosconero – Bosconero, Piedmont
- Tomino di Casalborgone – Casalborgone, Piedmont
- Tomino di Rivalta – Piedmont
- Tomino di San Giacomo di Boves – San Giacomo di Boves, Piedmont
- Tomino di Saronsella (Chivassotto) – Piedmont
- Tomino di Sordevolo – Sordevolo, Piedmont
- Tomino di Talucco – Piedmont
- Tomino "Montoso" – Piedmont

- Torta (cheese)

- Torta Orobica – Province of Bergamo, Lombardy
- Torta mascarpone

- Toscanello – Maremma, Tuscany
- Tosela – Trentino

- Tosèla del Primiero – Trentino

- Toumin dal mel – Piedmont
- Tre Valli – Province of Pordenone, Friuli-Venezia Giulia
- Treccia

- Treccia dura – Basilicata
- Treccia dei Cerviati e Centaurino – Campania

- Trifulin – Langhe, Piedmont
- Trizza – Sardinia
- Tronchetto

- Tronchetto alpino – Province of Piacenza, Emilia-Romagna
- Tronchetto di capra – Langhe, Piedmont
- Tronchetto stagionato – Lombardy

- Trugole – Province of Vicenza, Veneto
- Tuma – Piedmont

- Tuma 'd Trausela – Piedmont
- Tuma di Celle – Province of Cuneo, Piedmont
- Tuma di langa sotto vetro – Langhe, Piedmont
- Tuma sicula – Sicily

- Tumazzu – Sicily

- Tumazzu di pecura ccu pipi – Sicily
- Tumazzu di piecura – Sicily
- Tumazzu di vacca – Sicily
- Tumazzu di vacca ccu pipi – Sicily

- Tumet di Pralungo – Piedmont
- Tumin

- Tumin del Mel – Melle, Piedmont

- Tumo de Caso (synonym for Casale di Elva) – Piedmont

== U ==
- Ubriaco – Veneto

- Ubriaco al Traminer di capra – Veneto

- Uova di bufala (see: Bocconcini) – Campania

== V ==
- Vaciarin – Piedmont
- Vaciarin valsesiano – Valsesia, Piedmont
- Val Brandet – Lombardy
- Valcasotto – Piedmont
- Valle d'Aosta Fromadzo or Vallée d'Aoste Fromadzo – DOP – Aosta Valley
- Valligiano – Val Brembana, Lombardy
- Valsesia ubriaco – Valsesia, Piedmont
- Valtellina casera – DOP – Lombardy
- Vastedda – Sicily

- Vastedda della Valle del Belice – Belice Valley, Sicily
- Vastedda palermitana – Province of Palermo, Sicily

- Vézzena – Trentino

== Z ==
- Ziegenkäse (see: Algunder Ziegenkäse) – South Tyrol
- Ziger – South Tyrol, Veneto
- Zigerkäse (synonym for Ziger) – South Tyrol
- Zighera – Trentino; a smoked cheese made in the mountains of Pinetano and the area of Valfloriana
- Zincarlin – Lombardy, Canton of Ticino
- Zumelle – Veneto
- Zufi – Piedmont; a fermented ricotta, somewhat related to Brös, made in Val Formazza, province of Novara
- Zuvi (synonym for Zufi.) – Piedmont

== See also ==
- Italian cuisine
- List of Italian PDO cheeses
- List of cheeses
