= Castelrosso =

Castelrosso may refer to:

- the Italian name for the Greek island and municipality of Kastellorizo;
- Castelrosso, a hamlet of Chivasso, Italy;
- Castelrosso cheese, an Italian cheese.
