= Caso peruto =

Italian goat milk cheese

Caso peruto, sometimes written as Casoperuto, is a round Italian goat's milk cheese. It produced from January to July in the town of Sessa Aurunca (Caserta) and is dated to the time of Pliny (1st century AD). It is rubbed with oil and vinegar before being stored in clay containers or glass jars and aged in a cellar for months, during which it is periodically washed with vinegar. It is greyish robust taste. It is listed on the Ark of Taste.

== See also ==
- List of Italian cheeses
