= Vezzena =

Italian cheese

Vezzena is a type of cow's milk cheese, produced in the area of plateau of Lavarone, Vezzena and Folgaria in the province of Trento, Italy. It is an Ark of Taste food.

== See also ==
- List of Italian cheeses
