= Crutin =

Italian cheese

Crutin is an Italian cheese made with cow's milk and black truffle flakes, prepared in Langhe, Piedmont. It is a crumbly, pale yellow cheese with a slight citrus and truffle flavour and aroma. The aroma of cellars where it is aged can also be inherent in the cheese. It is typically aged for one to two months.

Crutin is named after "a small cellar excavated from stone", which was used by Langhe farmers for winter storage purposes.

== See also ==
- List of Italian cheeses
