= Calcagno (cheese) =

Italian cheese

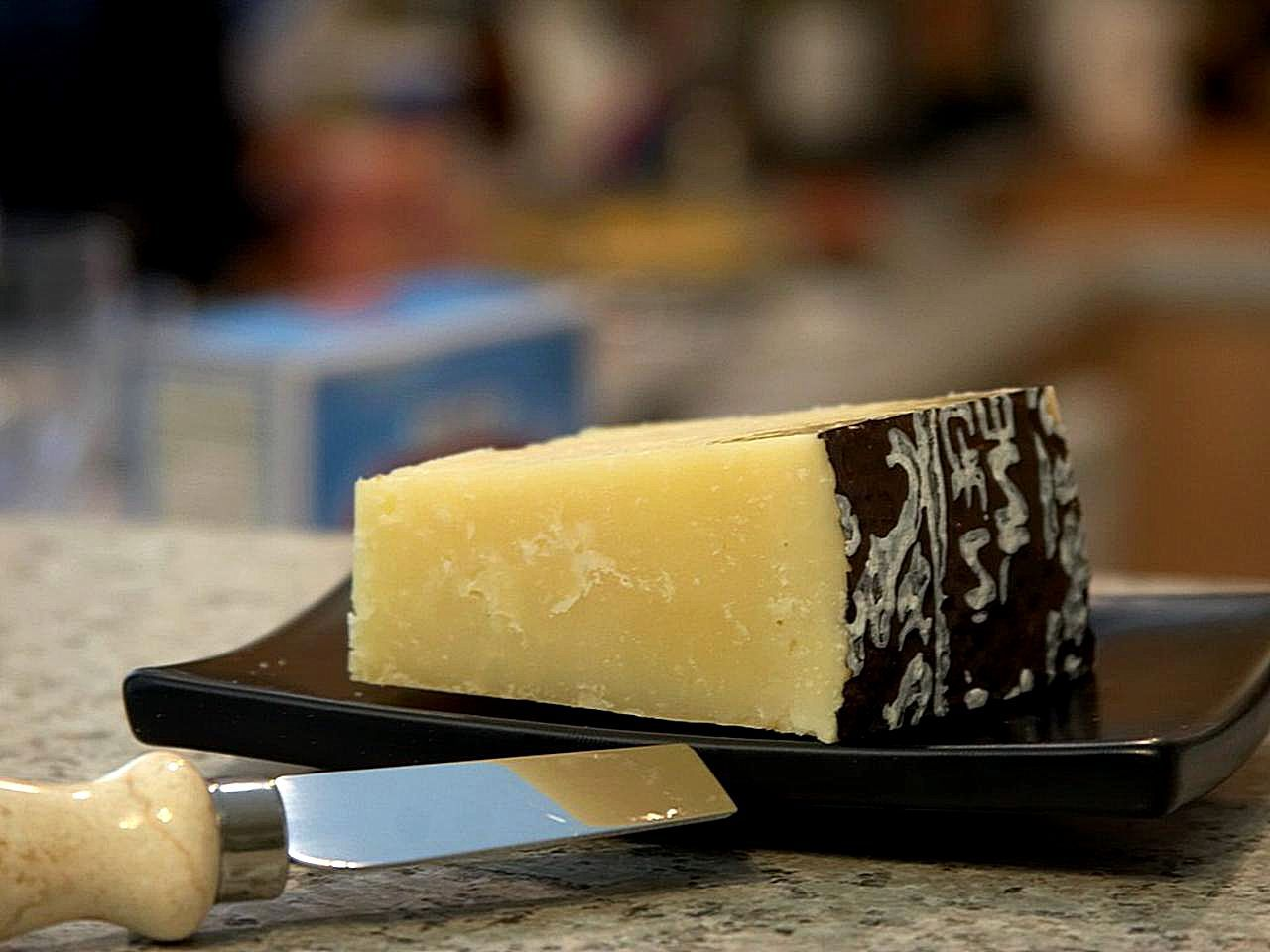
Calcagno cheese

Calcagno is an Italian type of pecorino cheese prepared using raw sheep's milk and peppercorns. It is a hard cheese that can be grated. In its preparation, peppercorns are added to the curd, the mixture is drained in baskets, salt is added, and the mix is aged for at least three months. As the cheese ages, it becomes grainier in texture, and its flavor becomes spicier, pungent and saltier. Calcagno originated in Sardinia, and is prepared in Sardinia and Sicily. It is sometimes aged for up to ten months.

== See also ==
- List of Italian cheeses
