= Crucolo =

Italian cheese

Crucolo is an artisanal cow's milk cheese made by a single producer at the Rifugio Crucolo, situated at the mouth of the Val Campelle, in the Trentino region of Italy.

The cheeses, which are matured for at least two months, are cylindrical in form and typically weigh 13 kg (29 lb). They are ivory tan in color with irregular holes throughout, and are available in three varieties.

== See also ==
- List of Italian cheeses
