= Pepato =

Sheep milk cheese with peppercorns

Pepato is a semi-hard sheep milk cheese with peppercorns. Pepato (or Pecorino pepato; Tumazzu di piecura ccu pepi, Siciliano) has its main origin in Sicily where it is part of the regional cooking. Usually is used as 2–4 months aged cheese, but a mild younger version (10 days) can easily be found in Italian stores. Peppercorns are added during the subtraction of the whey.

== See also ==
- List of Italian cheeses
