= Reblec =

Small-rimmed cheese

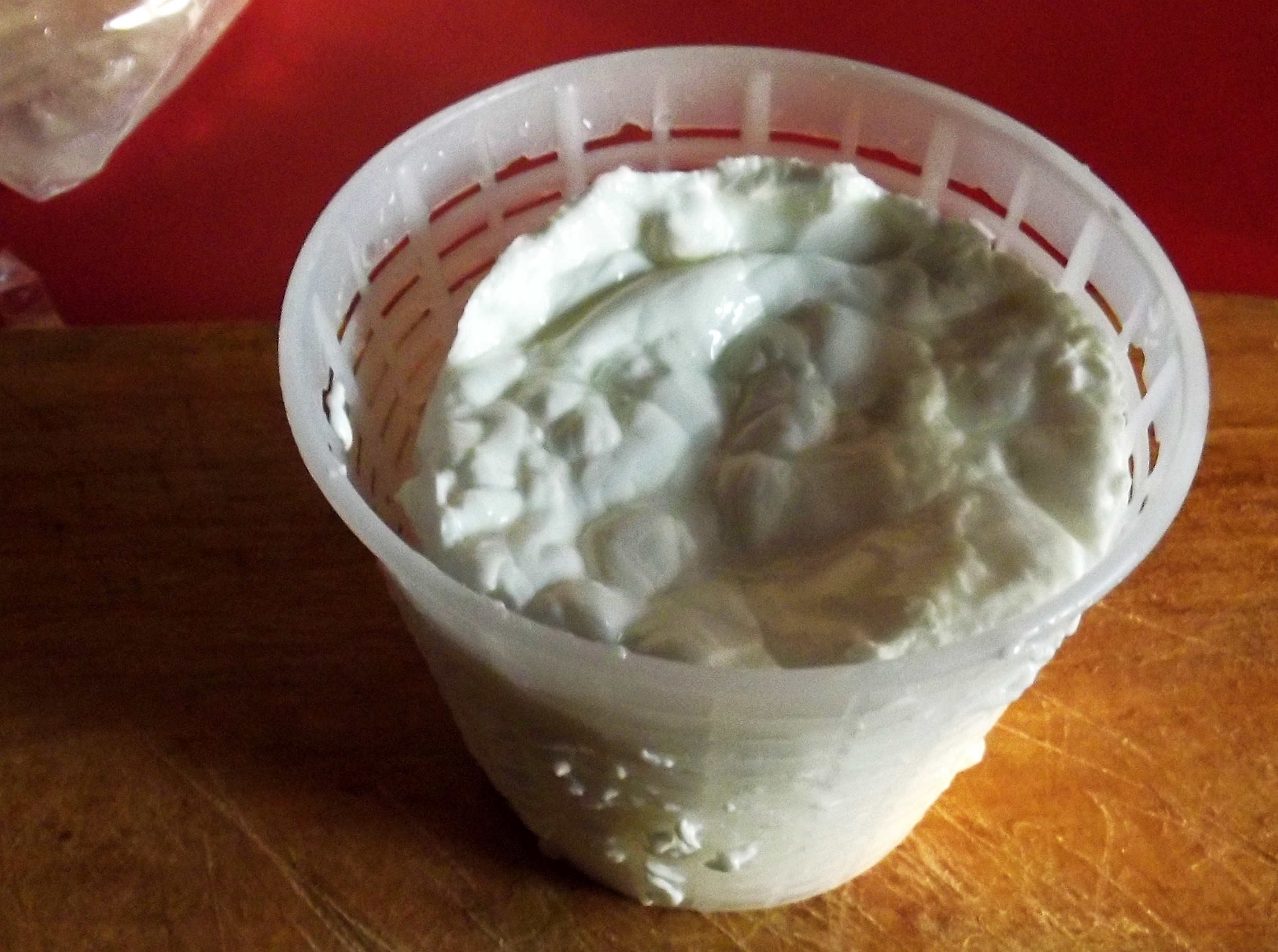
- Alternative names: Réblèque
- Place of origin: Italy
- Region or state: Aosta Valley

Reblec or réblèque is a fresh, small-rimmed cheese made from spontaneously surfaced cream, to which whole raw milk is added.

If cream is also added during production, it takes the name reblec de crama, which means 'cream reblec' in Valdôtain dialect.

== Etymology ==
The name comes from the Valdôtain dialect term reblètsé, meaning to empty the cows' teats after milking, reiterative of the verb blètsé, meaning 'to milk'.

Reblec follows the same etymology as Reblochon.

== Production and consumption ==
Reblec is mainly produced in the Aosta Valley and it can be consumed as early as 12 hours after it is made.

It is also served as a dessert, topped with sugar, cinnamon or with a dusting of cocoa powder.

== See also ==
- List of Italian cheeses
