= Acceglio (cheese) =

Italian cheese

Acceglio is an Italian cow's milk cheese made in Acceglio, in the Piedmont region.

It is made with skimmed milk, is unseasoned and must be consumed fresh. It is produced only in the summer.

== See also ==
- List of Italian cheeses
