= Castelrosso cheese =

Italian cheese

Castelrosso, also called Toma Brusca, is an Italian pasteurized whole cow's milk cheese. A rare, semi-hard, ancient cheese, it comes from the Piedmont region of Italy.

It is similar in appearance to Castelmagno cheese. It has a natural thick, gray rind smattered with yellow mold, and a dry, crumbly, snowy white paste. The flavor is mild: lactic, buttery, and clean with a gentle, residual tang similar to Lancashire and other English cheddar-styles. It complements Italian condiments such as grape mostarda and chestnut honeys. As it ages it becomes harder and drier, but retains its crumbly characteristic. It is made from whole cow's milk, rennet, salt and milk enzymes and matured in underground cellars on silver fir shelves for about 60 days.

== See also ==
- List of Italian cheeses
