= Sottocenere al tartufo =

Italian cheese

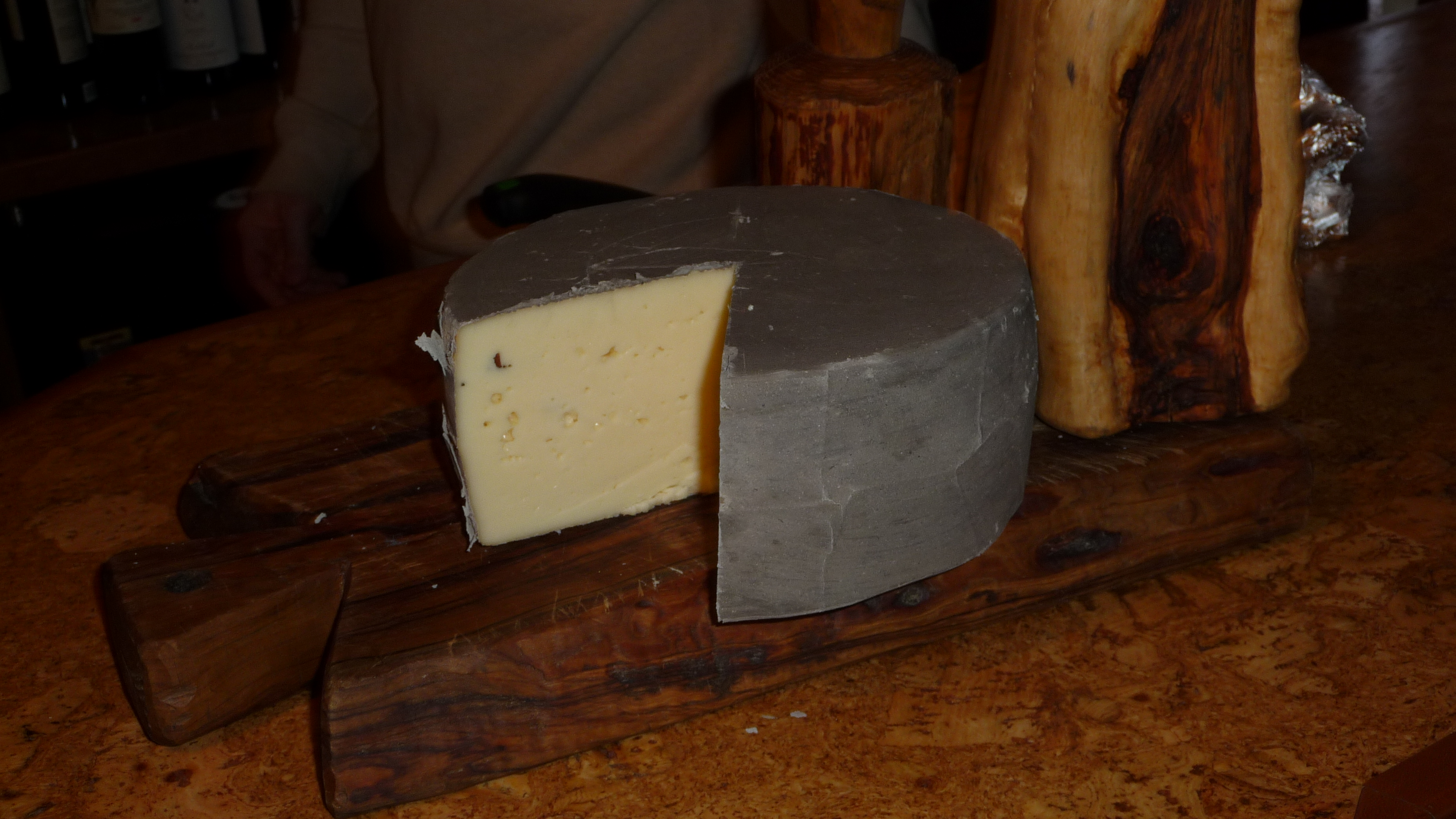
Sottocenere al Tartufo

Sottocenere al tartufo is a very pale yellow to off-white cheese with truffles that has a grey-brown ash rind. It has a somewhat mild taste and is semi-soft in firmness.

Sottocenere (meaning "under ash") is originally from Venice, Italy, and is made with pasteurized cow's milk and slices of truffles, then rubbed with various herbs and spices. It is aged in an ash rind as a way to preserve it over a long period without losing flavor, a tradition in the Venetian region. The ash is also used to convey subtle flavors into the cheese, with a variety of spices (cinnamon and nutmeg, among others) mixed with the ash. The al tartufo refers to the addition of slivers of black truffle into the cheese, during the cheese making.
