= Ubriaco =

Ubriaco is an Italian surname. Notable people with the surname include:

- Darío Ubriaco (born 1972), Uruguayan football referee
- Gene Ubriaco (born 1937), Canadian ice hockey executive and player
