= List of Protected Designation of Origin products by country =

This is a list of Protected Designation of Origin (PDO) products by country. A Protected Designation of Origin is a Geographical Indication under EU and UK law. Applications can be made both for EU/UK product designation and for other territories. A complete list of registered PDO's in the EU is available in eAmbrosia, the official register of the European Commission, as well as in GIview, a database by the European Union Intellectual Property Office (EUIPO) and the European Commission.

== Multiple countries ==
For a limited number of products, the PDO status is registered with regards to a geographical area which comprises (parts of) two countries. They are listed below:

Product name	Area	Short description	Image
Istra	parts of Croatian and Slovenian Istria	Istra is an extra-virgin olive oil, produced in an area where olive trees have been present since Ancient Roman times. The olive oil is bitter and has a high oleic acid content (generally >74 %) and linolenic acid <10 %.	
Istarski pršut / Istrski pršut	parts of Croatian and Slovenian Istria	Istarski pršut (Croatian) / Istrski pršut (Slovenian) is a "dry-cured meat product made of a pig's ham without the foot, the skin and the subcutaneous fat but with the pelvic bones, which is dry-brined with sea salt and spices, air-dried without smoking and then dried and matured for at least 12 months", which is similar to prosciutto.	
Maasvallei Limburg	Meuse Valley at the border of the Netherlands and Belgium	Maasvallei Limburg is a wine comprising parts of the areas surrounding the "shingle Maas", the Meuse where it forms the physical border between the Netherlands and Belgium. The area is part of the Dutch province Limburg as well as the Belgian province Limburg. Grapes from which the wine may be produced are Acolon, Auxerrois, Chardonnay, Dornfelder, Gewürztraminer, Pinot Blanc, Pinot Gris, Pinot Noir, Riesling and Siegerrebe.	
Miód z Sejneńszczyny / Łoździejszczyzny / Seinų / Lazdijų krašto medus	Sejny and Suwałki county in Poland and Lazdijai District Municipality in Lithuania	Miód z Sejneńszczyny is a bees' honey from polyfloral nectar, which received a PDO designation in 2012.	

== Austria ==
Product name	Area	Short description	Image
Sura Kees	Montafon valley in Vorarlberg (Austria)	Sura Kees (Alemannic: "sour cheese"), also known as Vorarlberger Sauerkäse or Montafoner Sauerkäse, is a low-fat sour milk cheese originally from the Montafon valley in Vorarlberg (Austria). It is traditionally made from skim milk and is a by-product of butter production. Sura Kees resembles the Tyrolean Grey Cheese. The registration of the PDO states that its production has been a significant element of Vorarlberg's peasant gastronomy for centuries. Sura Kees is usually served with vinegar, oil and onions, pure on black bread or eaten with potatoes.	Sura-Kees
Tiroler Graukäse	Tyrolean Alp valleys (Austria).	Tyrolean grey cheese (Graukäse) is a strongly flavoured, rennet-free cows-milk acid-curd cheese made in the Tyrolean Alp valleys, Austria. It owes its name to the grey mold that usually grows on its rind. It is extremely low in fat (around 0.5%) and it has a powerful penetrating smell. The cheese is registered as protected designation of origin under the official name Tiroler Graukäse g.U. The registration of the PDO states that its production has been a significant element of Tyrolean peasant gastronomy for centuries. Graukäse making became widespread on farms due to the simplicity of making and the availability of low-fat milk after the fat had been taken for use in butter making.	Tyrolean grey cheese Loaf Cut
Tiroler Speck	Tyrol	Tyrolean Speck is a distinctively juniper-flavored ham originally from Tyrol, a historical region that since 1918 partially lies in Italy. Its origins at the intersection of two culinary worlds is reflected in its synthesis of salt-curing and smoking. The first historical mention of Tyrolean Speck was in the early 13th century when some of the current production techniques were already in use. Südtiroler Speck (Italian: Speck Alto Adige) is now a protected geographic designation with PGI status.	Speck
Vorarlberger Bergkäse	Vorarlberg	Vorarlberger Bergkäse ("Vorarlberg mountain cheese") is a regional cheese specialty from the Austrian state of Vorarlberg. It is protected within the framework of the European designation of origin (PDO).	Bergkäse, Mountain cheese, unknown origin, Label Milfina

== Belgium ==
Product name	Area	Short description	Image
Beurre d'Ardenne	Ardenne	Beurre d'Ardenne is a type of butter made in the Ardenne of Belgium from cow's milk. As a traditional product of the area, it received Belgian appellation d'origine by royal decree in 1984, and received European protected designation of origin status in 1996.	

== Bulgaria ==
Product name	Area	Short description	Image
Българско бяло саламурено сирене / Bulgarsko byalo salamureno sirene	Bulgaria	Българско бяло саламурено сирене / Bulgarsko byalo salamureno sirene is a type of brined cheese originating from Bulgaria, and which is a brined cheese as is also common in the Balkans. It is made entirely from or from a mixture of goat, sheep, cow or buffalo milk. It is slightly crumbly, with at least 46–48% dry matter containing 44–48% fat. It is commonly produced in blocks, and has a slightly grainy texture. It is used as a table cheese, in salads, and in baking.	Sirene
Българско кисело мляко / Bulgarsko kiselo mlyako	Bulgaria	Българско кисело мляко / Bulgarsko kiselo mlyako is Bulgarian yogurt, a dairy product made from raw sheep, cow, buffalo or goat milk or from a mixture thereof, produced in Bulgaria using a symbiotic starter of the bacteria Lactobacillus delbrueckii subsp. bulgaricus and Streptococcus thermophilus, which have not been genetically modified.	Kiselo mlyako
Странджански манов мед / Strandzhanski manov med	Bulgaria	Странджански манов мед / Strandzhanski manov med (alternatively манов мед от Странджа / manov med ot Strandzha) is honeydew honey from the humid old-growth oak forests of Strandzha, a low and extensive mountain range adjacent to the Black Sea coast of southeastern Bulgaria. The honey is smooth and intensely brown, with a slightly bitter aftertaste, and is a product of the region's warm maritime climate with frequent morning mists.	
Странджански билков чай / Strandzhanski bilkov chay	Bulgaria	Странджански билков чай / Strandzhanski bilkov chay is herbal tea made from dried leaves and flowers of Sideritis plants in the Strandzha Nature Park area. Sideritis syriaca is a critically endangered native species in Bulgaria that has been successfully cultivated in Strandzha. The tea has a sweet and richly aromatic flavour and contains antioxidants and phenols.	

== China ==
Product name	Area	Short description	Image
龍井茶 / 龙井茶 / Longjing cha	Xihu, Qiantang and Yuezhou in Zhejiang	Longjing cha (龍井茶 or 龙井茶) is a green tea characterized by "its green colour, rich aroma, sweet aftertaste, and its beautiful flat, smooth and straight appearance".	Longjing cha

== Cyprus ==
Product name	Area	Short description	Image
Halloumi/Χαλλούμι/Hellim	Cyprus	Halloumi (Χαλλούμι in Greek, Hellim in Turkish) is a brined cheese that originates from Cyprus. It's traditionally made from sheep's and goat's milk, but sometimes cow's milk is also used. What makes halloumi unique is its high melting point, which allows it to be grilled, fried, or baked without melting or losing its shape. This also gives it a characteristically squeaky texture when you bite into it. The earliest known surviving descriptions of Cypriot halloumi were recorded in the mid-16th century.	Grilled Halloumi cheese

== Denmark ==
Product name	Area	Short description	Image
Dons	Dons valley (near Kolding) in Southern Denmark	Dons is a wine from the Dons valley, a valley of glacial origin. The wine is produced from grapes (mainly Zalas Perle, Cabernet Cortis, Orion, Madeleine Angevine, Solaris, Rondo, Regent, Pinot Noir) at a maximum of 5000 kg/hectare.	

== Finland ==
Product name	Area	Short description	Image
Lapin puikula	Lapland (Finland)	Lapin puikula is a type of potato grown in Lapland, and adjusted to the cold climatic conditions.	Lapin puikula
Lapin Poron liha	Lapland (Finland)	Reindeer meat from Lapland	
Lapin poron kuivaliha	Lapland (Finland)	Dried reindeer meat from Lapland	
Lapin Poron kylmäsavuliha	Lapland (Finland)	Cold-smoked reindeer meat from Lapland	
Kitkan viisas	Koillismaa	Vendace caught in highland lakes of the Koillismaa region in Kuusamo and Posio with characteristic soft backbone	

== France ==
Product name	Area	Short description	Image
Abondance	Haute-Savoie	Abondance is a semi-hard, fragrant, raw-milk cheese made in the Haute-Savoie department of France. Its name comes from a small commune also called Abondance. A round of Abondance weighs approximately 10 kg (22 lb), and its aroma is comparable to Beaufort, another French cheese variety. Abondance is made exclusively from milk produced by the Abondance, montbéliarde, and tarine breeds of cattle. By 2022, the herd producing the milk for Abondance cheese will need to be a minimum of 55 percent Abondance breed, the rest being made up of Tarine and Montbéliarde. In 1998, 873 tonnes were produced (+16.4 percent since 1996), 34 percent from local farms. Abondance cheese was granted an Appellation d'origine contrôlée or AOC in 1990.	Abondance
Jambon de Bayonne	Bayonne	Bayonne ham or jambon de Bayonne is a cured ham that takes its name from the ancient port city of Bayonne in the far southwest of France, a city located in both the cultural regions of Basque Country and Gascony. It has PGI status.	Bayonne ham
Beaufort	Savoie	Beaufort is a firm, raw cow's milk cheese associated with the gruyère family. An Alpine cheese, it is produced in Beaufortain, Tarentaise valley and Maurienne, which are located in the Savoie region of the French Alps. Beaufort was first certified as an appellation d'origine contrôlée in 1968.	Beaufort
Beurre d'Isigny	Isigny-sur-Mer	Beurre d'Isigny is a type of cow's milk butter made in the Veys Bay area and the valleys of the rivers running into it, comprising several French communes surrounding Isigny-sur-Mer and straddling the Manche and Calvados departments of northern France. The butter has a natural golden colour as a result of high levels of carotenoids. The butter contains 82% fatty solids and is rich in oleic acid and mineral salts (particularly sodium). These salts provide flavour and a long shelf-life. The local producers requested protection for their milk products as early as the 1930s with a definition of the production area, finally receiving PDO status in 1996.	Ad for the butter, 1900
Bleu d'Auvergne	Auvergne	Bleu d'Auvergne is a French blue cheese, named for its place of origin in the Auvergne region of south-central France. It is made from cow's milk, and is one of the cheeses granted the Appellation d'origine contrôlée from the French government. Bleu d'Auvergne was developed in the mid-1850s by a French cheesemaker named Antoine Roussel. Roussel noted that the occurrence of blue molds on his curd resulted in an agreeable taste, and conducted experiments to determine how veins of such mold could be induced. After several failed tests, Roussel discovered that the application of rye bread mold created the veining, and that pricking the curd with a needle provided increased aeration. The increased oxygenation enabled the blue mold to grow in the pockets of air within the curd. Subsequently, his discovery and techniques spread throughout the region. Today, bleu d'Auvergne is prepared via mechanical needling processes. It is then aged for approximately four weeks in cool, wet cellars before distribution, a relatively short period for blue cheeses.	Bleu d'Auvergne cheese
Brie de Meaux	Brie region	Brie de Meaux is a French brie cheese of the Brie region and a designated AOC (now PDO) product since 1980. Its name comes from the town of Meaux in the Brie region. As of 2003, 6,774 tonnes (-13.4% since 1998) were produced annually.	Brie de Meaux
Brocciu Corse / Brocciu		Brocciu is a Corsican cheese produced from a combination of milk and whey, giving it some of the characteristics of whey cheese. It is produced from ewe's milk. It is notable as a substitute for lactose-rich Italian Ricotta, as brocciu contains less lactose. Produced on the island of Corsica, brocciu is considered the island's most representative food. Like ricotta, it is a young white cheese and is paired frequently with Corsican white wines. It has been described as "the most famous cheese" in Corsica. The word brocciu is related to the French word brousse and means fresh cheese made with goat or ewe's milk. Brocciu is made from whey and milk. First, the whey is heated to a low temperature of just a few degrees below 100 °F (38 °C) and then ewe's milk is added and further heated to just a bit below 200 °F (93 °C). After heating, the cheese is drained in rush baskets. The cheese is ready for consumption immediately, although it may be ripened for a few weeks (Corsican: brocciu passu or brocciu vechju); the ideal affinage time for brocciu is 48 hours to one month. In Corsican cuisine, it is used in the preparation of innumerable dishes, from first courses to desserts.	Brocciu
Camembert de Normandie	Normandy	Camembert de Normandie is a moist, soft, creamy, surface-ripened cow's milk cheese. It was first made in the late 18th century at Camembert, Normandy, in northwest France.	Camembert
Cantal / Fourme de Cantal	Auvergne	Cantal / Fourme de Cantal is an uncooked firm cheese produced in the Auvergne region of central France: more particularly in the département of Cantal (named after the Cantal mountains) as well as in certain adjoining districts. Cantal cheese was granted Appellation d'Origine Contrôlée certification in 1956. One of the oldest cheeses in France, Cantal dates back to the times of the Gauls. It came to prominence when Marshal Henri de La Ferté-Senneterre served it at the table of Louis XIV. Senneterre is also responsible for the introduction of Saint-Nectaire and Salers. Cantal, Auvergne AOC, 1956.	Cantal
Chabichou du Poitou	France	Chabichou du Poitou (also known as Poitou) is a traditional semi-soft, unpasteurized, natural-rind French goat cheese (or Fromage de Chèvre) with a firm and creamy texture. Chabichou is formed in a cylindrical shape which is called a "bonde", per the shape of the bunghole of a gun barrel. and is aged for 10 to 20 days. It is the only goat cheese that is soft ripened allowed by Protected Designation of Origin regulations to be produced using pasteurized milk. Chabichou is very white and smooth, and flexible to the palate, with a fine caprine odor.	Chabichou
Champagne	France	Champagne is a French sparkling wine. The term Champagne comes from its region where it is produced in "Champagne". It is illegal to label any product Champagne unless it came from the Champagne wine region of France and is produced under the rules of the appellation. This alcoholic drink is produced from specific types of grapes grown in the Champagne region following rules that demand, among other things, specific vineyard practices, sourcing of grapes exclusively from designated places within the Champagne region, specific grape-pressing methods and secondary fermentation of the wine in the bottle to cause carbonation. Vineyards in the Champagne region of France The grapes Pinot noir, Pinot meunier, and Chardonnay are primarily used to produce almost all Champagne, but small amounts of Pinot blanc, Pinot gris, Arbane, and Petit Meslier are vinified as well. Only these specific grapes grown according to appellation rules on designated plots of land within the appellation may be used to make Champagne. Champagne became associated with royalty in the 17th, 18th, and 19th centuries. The leading manufacturers made efforts to associate their Champagnes with nobility and royalty through advertising and packaging, which led to its popularity among the emerging middle class.	A glass of Champagne exhibiting the characteristic bubbles associated with the wine
Chaource	Chaource	Chaource is a French cheese, originally manufactured in the village of Chaource in the Champagne-Ardenne region. Chaource is a cow's milk cheese, cylindrical in shape at around 10 cm in diameter and 6 cm in height, weighing either 250 or 450 g. The central pâte is soft, creamy in colour, and slightly crumbly, and is surrounded by a white Penicillium candidum rind. It was recognised as an Appellation d'Origine Contrôlée (AOC) cheese in 1970 and has been fully regulated since 1977.	Chaource
Chevrotin	Savoy	Chevrotin is a soft goat's milk based cheese produced in the historical region of Savoy, France. Since 2002 it has enjoyed an AOC designation.	Chevrotin
Comté	Franche-Comté	Comté (or Gruyère de Comté) is a French cheese made from unpasteurized cow's milk in the Franche-Comté traditional province of eastern France bordering Switzerland and sharing much of its cuisine. Comté has the highest production of all French AOC cheeses, at around 66,500 tonnes annually. It is classified as a Swiss-type or Alpine cheese. The cheese is made in discs, each between 40 cm (16 in) and 70 cm (28 in) in diameter, and around 10 cm (4 in) in height. Each disc weighs up to 50 kg (110 lb) with an FDM around 45%. The rind is usually a dusty-brown colour, and the internal paste, pâte, is a pale creamy yellow. The texture is relatively hard and flexible, and the taste is mild and slightly sweet.	
Crottin de Chavignol / Chavignol	Loire Valley	Crottin de Chavignol is a goat cheese produced in the Loire Valley. This cheese is the claim to fame for the village of Chavignol, France, which has only two hundred inhabitants. Protected by the AOC Seal, Crottin de Chavignol is produced today with traditional methods. If a cheese is labelled "Crottin de Chavignol", it has to be from the area around Chavignol, and it has to meet the stringent AOC production criteria.	Retail shop of one of Chavignol's two cheese makers
Époisses	Époisses	Époisses, also known as Époisses de Bourgogne, is a legally demarcated cheese made in the village of Époisses and its environs, in the département of Côte-d'Or, about halfway between Dijon and Auxerre, in the former duchy of Burgundy, France, from agricultural processes and resources traditionally found in that region. Époisses is a pungent soft-paste cows-milk cheese. Smear-ripened, "washed rind" (washed in brine and Marc de Bourgogne, the local pomace brandy), it is circular at around either 10 cm (3.9 in) or 18 cm (7.1 in) in diameter, with a distinctive soft red-orange color. It is made either from raw or pasteurized milk. It is sold in a circular wooden box, and in restaurants, is sometimes served with a spoon due to its extremely soft texture. The cheese is often paired with Trappist beer or even Sauternes rather than a red wine.	French cheese Époisses brand Germain in a box
Figue de Solliès	Solliès-Pont	Figue de Solliès is a fig variety grown in the Var department in the Provence-Alpes-Côte d'Azur region in southeastern France. It accounts for 75% of the fig market in France. The fruit is shaped like a crushed teardrop, with a violet exterior and a glossy, dark red interior containing numerous beige seeds. The smell has notes of watermelon, honeydew melon, and strawberries.	Figues de Solliès
Fourme de Montbrison	Montbrison	Fourme de Montbrison is a cow's-milk cheese made in the regions of Rhône-Alpes and Auvergne in southern France. It derives its name from the town of Montbrison in the Loire department. The word fourme is derived from the Latin word forma meaning "shape", the same root from which the French word fromage is believed to have been derived. The cheese is manufactured in tall cylindrical blocks weighing between 1.5 and 2 kg (3.3 and 4.4 lb). The blocks are 13 centimetres in diameter and 19 centimetres tall, although the cheese is most frequently sold in shops in much shorter cylindrical slices. Fourme de Montbrison has a characteristic orange-brown rind with a creamy-coloured pâte, speckled with gentle streaks of blue mould. Its Appellation d'Origine Contrôlée status was granted in 1972 under a joint decree with Fourme d'Ambert, a similar blue cheese also from the same region. In 2002 the two cheeses received AOC status in their own right, recognizing the differences in their manufacture. With a musty scent, the cheese is extremely mild for a blue cheese and has a dry taste.	Fourme de Montbrison
Laguiole cheese	Aveyron	Laguiole, sometimes called Tome de Laguiole, is a French cheese from the plateau of Aubrac, situated at between 800 – 1500m, in the region of Aveyron in the southern part of France. It takes its name from the little village Laguiole and has been protected under the French Appellation d'Origine Contrôlée (AOC) since 1961 and by the amended decree in 1986. Laguiole is said to have been invented at a monastery in the mountains of Aubrac in the 19th century. According to historical accounts, the monks passed down the recipe for making this cheese from cattle during the alpages to the local buronniers, the owners of burons, or mountain huts.	Laguiole
Langres cheese	Langres	Langres is a French cheese from the plateau of Langres in the region of Champagne-Ardenne. It has benefited from an Appellation d'origine contrôlée (AOC) since 1991. Langres is a cow's milk cheese, cylindrical in shape, weighing about 180 g. The central pâte is soft, creamy in colour, and slightly crumbly, and is surrounded by a white Penicillium candidum rind. It is a less pungent cheese than Époisses, its local competition. It is best eaten between May and August after five weeks of aging, but it is also excellent March through December. Production in 1998 was around 305 tons, a decline of 1.61% since 1996, and 2% on farms.	Langres fromage AOP coupe
Ail rose de Lautrec	Lautrec	Lautrec Pink Garlic is a protected geographical indication indicating a specific production of garlic from the Lautrec commune in the Tarn department in southern France. This crop has been, since 1966, listed under the French Label Rouge "ail rose" (pink garlic) and under the protected geographical indication ail rose de Lautrec (Lautrec Pink Garlic) since 12 June 1996.	Manouille of the garlic
Lentille verte du Puy	Le Puy	Le Puy green lentil is a small, mottled, slate-gray/green lentil of the Lens esculenta puyensis (or L. culinaris puyensis) variety. In the US, this type of lentil may be grown and sold as French green lentils or Puy lentils. The term "Le Puy green lentil" is protected throughout the European Union (EU) under that governing body's Protected Designation of Origin, and in France as an appellation d'origine contrôlée (AOC). In the EU, the term may only be used to designate lentils that come from the prefecture of Le Puy (most notably in the commune of Le Puy-en-Velay) in the Auvergne region of France. These lentils have been grown in the region for over 2,000 years and it is said that they have gastronomic qualities that come from the terroir (in this case attributed to the area's volcanic soil). They are praised for their unique peppery flavor and the ability to retain their shape after cooking.	Puy lentils in a wooden bowl
Livarot cheese	Livarot	Livarot is a French cheese of the Normandy region, originating in the commune of Livarot, and protected by an Appellation d'Origine Contrôlée (AOC) since 1975. It is a soft, pungent, washed rind cheese made from Normande cow's milk. The normal weight for a round of Livarot is 450 g, though it also comes in other weights. It is sold in cylindrical form with the orangish rind wrapped in 3 to 5 rings of dried reedmace (Typha latifolia). For this reason, it has been referred to as 'colonel', as the rings of dried bullrush resemble the stripes on a colonel's uniform. Sometimes green paper is also used. Its orange colour comes from different sources depending on the manufacturer, but is often annatto. The bacterium Brevibacterium linens is employed in fermentation. Production in 1998 was 1,101 tons, down 12.2% since 1996. Only 12% of Livarot are made from raw, unpasteurised milk. Its period of optimal tasting is spread out from May to September after a refining from 6 to 8 weeks, but it is also excellent from March to December.	Livarot (fromage) 02
Maroilles / Marolles	Picardy	Maroilles (pronounced mar wahl, also known as Marolles) is a cow's-milk cheese made in the regions of Picardy and Nord-Pas-de-Calais in northern France. It derives its name from the village of Maroilles in the region in which it is still manufactured. The cheese is sold in individual rectangular blocks with a moist orange-red washed rind and a strong smell. In its mass-produced form it is around 13 centimetres (5 in) square and 6 centimetres (2 in) in height, weighing around 700 grams (25 oz) In addition, according to its AOC regulations, cheeses eligible for AOC status can be one of three other sizes: Sorbais – (3/4) 12-12.5 cm square, 4 cm high, 550 g in weight. ripening: at least 4 weeks.; Mignon – (1/2) 11-11.5 cm square, 3 cm high, 350 g in weight. ripening: at least 3 weeks.; Quart – (1/4) 8-8.5 cm square, 3 cm high, 180 g in weight. ripening: at least 2 weeks.	Maroilles
Morbier	Morbier	Morbier is a semi-soft cows' milk cheese of France named after the small village of Morbier in Franche-Comté. It is ivory colored, soft and slightly elastic, and is immediately recognizable by the distinctive thin black layer separating it horizontally in the middle. It has a yellowish, sticky rind. The aroma of Morbier cheese is mild, with a rich and creamy flavour. It has a semblance to Raclette cheese in consistency and aroma. The Jura and Doubs versions both benefit from an appellation d'origine contrôlée (AOC), though other non-AOC Morbier exist on the market.	
Munster / Munster-Géromé	Vosges	Munster, Munster-géromé, or (Alsatian) Minschterkaas, is a strong-smelling soft cheese with a subtle taste, made mainly from milk first produced in the Vosges, between Alsace-Lorraine and Franche-Comté regions in France. The name "Munster" is derived from the Alsace town of Munster, where, among Vosgian abbeys and monasteries, the cheese was conserved and matured in monks' cellars.	Munster
Neufchâtel	Neufchâtel-en-Bray	Neufchâtel is a soft, slightly crumbly, mold-ripened cheese made in the Neufchâtel-en-Bray, French region of Normandy. One of the oldest kinds of cheese in France, its production is believed to date back to the 6th century. It looks similar to Camembert, with a dry, white, edible rind, but the taste is saltier and sharper. Unlike other soft-white-rinded cheeses, Neufchâtel has a grainy texture. It is usually sold in heart shapes but is also produced in other forms, such as logs and boxes. It is typically matured for 8–10 weeks and weighs around 100 to 600 g.	Cœur de Neufchâtel
Olive de Nice	Nice	The Olive de Nice is an olive from the Alpes-Maritimes area of France. The specification states that they must be of the Cailletier variety, and harvest must not exceed 6 tons per hectare.	Olive de Nice
Ossau-Iraty	Basque	Ossau-Iraty is an Occitan-Basque cheese made from sheep milk. It has been recognized as an appellation d'origine contrôlée (AOC) product since 1980. It is one of three sheep's milk cheeses granted AOC status in France (the others are Roquefort and Brocciu). It is of ancient origin, traditionally made by the shepherds in the region.	Ossau-Iraty
Pélardon	Cévennes	Pélardon, formerly called paraldon, pélardou and also péraudou, is a French cheese from the Cévennes range of the Languedoc-Roussillon region. It is a traditional cheese made from goat's milk. It is round soft-ripened cheese covered in a white mold (à pâte molle à croûte fleurie) weighing approximately 60 grams, with a diameter of 60–70 mm and a height of 22–27 mm. Pélardon is registered as a PDO since August 2000.	Pelardon
Picodon	Rhône	Picodon is a goats-milk cheese made in the region around the Rhône in southern France. The name means "spicy" in Occitan. The cheese itself comes in a number of varieties, each small, flat and circular in shape varying from speckled white to golden in colour. Between 5 and 8 cm (2.0 and 3.1 in) in diameter and between 1.8 and 2.5 cm (0.71 and 0.98 in) in height, they range from around 40 to 100 grams. The pâte of the cheese is spicy and unusually dry, whilst retaining a smooth, fine texture. Whilst young the cheese has a soft white rind and has a gentle, fresh taste. If aged for longer, the cheese can lose half of its weight resulting in a golden rind with a much harder centre and a more concentrated flavour.	Picodon
Pont-l'Évêque	Pont-l'Évêque	Pont-l'Évêque is a French cheese, originally manufactured in the area around the commune of Pont-l'Évêque, between Deauville and Lisieux in the Calvados département of Normandy. It is probably the oldest Norman cheese still in production. Pont-l'Évêque was recognised as an Appellation d'Origine Contrôlée (AOC) cheese on 30 August 1972, reaching full status in 1976. Its production was defined and protected with a decree of 29 December 1986. Le Petit Futé guides commend that the best AOC Pont-l'évêque comes from the Pays d'Auge, which includes the Canton of Pont-l'Evêque itself.	Pont-l'Évêque
Pouligny-Saint-Pierre	Indre	Pouligny-Saint-Pierre is a French goats'-milk cheese made in the Indre department of central France. Its name is derived from the commune of Pouligny-Saint-Pierre in the Indre department where it was first made in the 18th century. The cheese is distinctive, being pyramidal in shape and golden brown in colour with speckles of grey-blue mould, and is often known by the nicknames "Eiffel Tower" or "Pyramid". It has a square base 6.5 cm wide, is around 9 cm high, and weighs 250 grams (8.8 oz). The central pâte is bright white with a smooth, crumbly texture that mixes an initial sour taste with salty and sweet overtones. The exterior has a musty odour reminiscent of hay. It is made exclusively from unpasteurised milk. Both fermier (farmhouse) and industriel (dairy) production is used with the fermier bearing a green label, and industriel a red label. Its region of production is relatively small, taking in only 22 communes.	Pouligny-saint-pierre (fromage)
Reblochon / Reblochon de Savoie	Savoie	Reblochon is a soft washed-rind and smear-ripened French cheese made in the Alpine region of Savoie from raw cow's milk. It has its own AOC designation. Reblochon was first produced in the Thônes and Arly valleys, in the Aravis massif. Thônes remains the centre of Reblochon production; the cheeses are still made in the local cooperatives. Until 1964 Reblochon was also produced in Italian areas of the Alps. Subsequently, the Italian cheese has been sold in declining quantities under such names as Rebruchon and Reblò alpino.	Farmhouse Reblochon, drying before ripening
Rocamadour	Rocamadour	Rocamadour is a French cheese from the southwest part of the country. It is produced in the regions of Périgord and Quercy and takes its name from the village of Rocamadour in the département of the Lot. Rocamadour belongs to a family of goat cheeses called Cabécous and has benefited from being accorded an AOC (appellation d'origine contrôlée) designation since 1996. It is a very small whitish cheese (average weight 35 g) with a flat round shape (see illustration). Rocamadour is usually sold very young after just 12–15 days of aging and is customarily consumed on hot toast or in salads. Rocamadour can be aged further. After several months it takes on a more intense flavor and is typically eaten on its own with a red wine toward the end of the meal. Production: 546 tonnes in 1998 (+24.1% since 1996), 100% with raw, unpasteurized goat milk (50% on farms).	Rocamadour
Roquefort	Roquefort-sur-Soulzon	Roquefort is a sheep milk cheese from Southern France, and is one of the world's best known blue cheeses. Though similar cheeses are produced elsewhere, EU law dictates that only those cheeses aged in the natural Combalou caves of Roquefort-sur-Soulzon may bear the name Roquefort, as it is a recognised geographical indication, or has a protected designation of origin. The cheese is white, tangy, crumbly and slightly moist, with distinctive veins of blue mold. It has a characteristic fragrance and flavor with a notable taste of butyric acid; the blue veins provide a sharp tang. It has no rind; the exterior is edible and slightly salty. A typical wheel of Roquefort weighs between 2.5 and 3 kg (5.5 and 6.6 lb), and is about 10 cm (4 in) thick. Each kilogram of finished cheese requires about 4.5 litres (1.2 US gal) of milk to produce. In France, Roquefort is often called the "King of Cheeses" or the "Cheese of Kings", although those names are also used for other cheeses. In 1925, the cheese was the recipient of France's first Appellation d'Origine Contrôlée when regulations controlling its production and naming were first defined. In 1961, in a landmark ruling that removed imitation, the Tribunal de Grande Instance at Millau decreed that, although the method for the manufacture of the cheese could be followed across the south of France, only those cheeses whose ripening occurred in the natural caves of Mont Combalou in Roquefort-sur-Soulzon were permitted to bear the name Roquefort.	Roquefort
Saint-Nectaire	Auvergne	Saint-Nectaire is a French cheese made in the Auvergne region of central France. The cheese has been made in Auvergne since at least the 17th century. Saint-Nectaire is an Appellation d'origine contrôlée (AOC), a certification given to French agricultural products based on a set of clearly defined standards. For example, it must be made of cow's milk in a specifically delimited area in the Monts-Dore region. The Appellation was first recognized at a national level and awarded AOC status in 1955. At that time, the Saint-Nectaire cheese was only produced on farms from milk from their own cows. When the appellation was accorded, industrial milk and dairy factories were also allowed to produce Saint-Nectaire. To differentiate between products made from the two processes, farmstead cheeses are marked with a small oval label in green casein, while a square label is applied to industrial cheeses. In 1996, a Protected Designation of Origin (PDO) was given to Saint-Nectaire, extending name protection to the entire European Union. A new appellation, "petit-Saint-Nectaire" (meaning "small Saint-Nectaire"), given to cheeses that weigh 600 grams, was later included in the specifications.	Box of saint Nectaire before aging (affinage)
Selles-sur-Cher	Centre-Val de Loire	Selles-sur-Cher is a French goat-milk cheese made in Centre-Val de Loire, France. Its name is derived from the commune of Selles-sur-Cher, Loir-et-Cher, where it was first made in the 19th century. The cheese is sold in small cylindrical units, around 8 cm in diameter at the base (reduced to around 7 cm at the top) and 2–3 cm in height, and weighing around 150 g. The central pâte is typical of goat cheese, rigid and heavy at first but moist and softening as it melts in the mouth. Its taste is lightly salty with a persistent aftertaste. The exterior is dry with a grey-blue mould covering its surface, and has a musty odour. The mould is often eaten and has a considerably stronger flavour. Around 1.3 L (0.34 US gal) of unpasteurised milk are used to make a single 150 grams (5.3 oz) cheese. After the milk is soured using the ferment it is heated to around 20 °C (68 °F). A small amount of rennet is added and left for 24 hours. Unlike most other types of cheese, the curd is ladled directly into its mould which contains tiny holes for the whey to run off naturally. The cheese is then left in a cool ventilated room at 80% humidity (dry compared to a typical cellar at 90–100% humidity) for between 10 and 30 days, during which time it dries as the mould forms on its exterior. An initial coating of charcoal encourages the formation of its characteristic mould. Selles-sur-Cher is made in fermier (36%), coopérative, and industriel production, with 747 tons produced in 2005. Although industriel production is now all year round, it is at its best between spring and autumn. The cheese was awarded AOC status in 1975. According to its AOC regulations, the cheese must be made within certain regions of the departments of Cher, Indre and Loir-et-Cher.	Selles-sur-cher
Valençay	Berry	Valençay is a cheese made in the province of Berry in central France. Its name is derived from the town of Valençay in the Indre department. Distinctive in its truncated pyramidal shape, Valençay is an unpasteurised goats-milk cheese weighing 200–250 grams (7.1–8.8 oz) and around 7 cm (2.8 in) in height. Its rustic blue-grey colour is made by the natural moulds that form its rind, darkened with a dusting of charcoal. The young cheese has a fresh, citric taste, with age giving it a nutty taste characteristic of goats cheeses. The cheese achieved AOC status in 1998 making Valençay the first region to achieve AOC status for both its cheese and its wine.	Valençay

== Germany ==
Product name	Area	Short description	Image
Allgäuer Bergkäse	Landkreise Lindau (Bodensee), Oberallgäu, Ostallgäu, Unterallgäu, Ravensburg und Bodenseekreis; Städte Kaufbeuren, Kempten and Memmingen	Allgäuer Bergkäse is made in Allgäu from unpasteurized cow's milk, it is ripened for a minimum of four months and has a smooth texture.	Allgäuer Bergkäse

== Greece ==
Product name	Area	Short description	Image
Γραβιέρα Κρήτης / Graviera Kritis	Crete	Graviera Kritis (Greek: Γραβιέρα Κρήτης) is a hard cheese produced in Crete sheep and goat milk and aged for a minimum of 3 months	
Φέτα / Feta	Greece	Feta (Greek: φέτα, féta) is a Greek brined curd white cheese made from sheep's milk or from a mixture of sheep and goat's milk. It is a soft, brined white cheese with small or no holes, a compact touch, few cuts, and no skin. It is formed into large blocks, and aged in brine. Its flavor is tangy and salty, ranging from mild to sharp. It is crumbly and has a slightly grainy texture. Feta is used as a table cheese, in salads such as Greek salad, and in pastries, notably the phyllo-based Greek dishes spanakopita ("spinach pie") and tyropita ("cheese pie"). It is often served with olive oil or olives, and sprinkled with aromatic herbs such as oregano. It can also be served cooked (often grilled), as part of a sandwich, in omelettes, and many other dishes. Feta cheese is produced in the traditional way which are made from sheep's milk, or from a mixture of sheep's and up to 30% of goat's milk from the same area.	Feta cheese
Φιρίκι Πηλίου / Firiki Piliou	Greece	Firiki Piliou ("Φιρίκι Πηλίου" in Greek) is a variety of miniature apples of the species Malus domestica Borkh.	
Φορμαέλλα Αράχωβας Παρνασσού / Formaella Arachovas Parnassou	Arachova	Formaella Arachovas Parnassou (Greek: Φορμαέλλα Αράχωβας Παρνασσού) is a hard cheese produced exclusively in Arachova, Greece. It is famous throughout Greece and has been registered in the European Union as a protected designation of origin since 1996. Formaela is prepared mainly from sheep's or goat's milk, has a hard and cohesive shell and is a light yellow color, without holes. It has a particularly pungent taste, and is usually consumed grilled or fried. Its chemical composition is: maximum moisture content of 38%, a minimum fat content of 40%.	
Ελιά Καλαμάτας / Elia Kalamatas	Kalamata	The Kalamata olive is a large, dark brown olive with a smooth, meaty texture, named after the city of Kalamata in the southern Peloponnese, Greece. Often used as table olives, they are usually preserved in wine vinegar or olive oil. Typically the term "Kalamata" legally refers to a region of Greece where these olives are grown, however a few countries (those mainly outside the United States and European Union) use the name for such olives grown anywhere, even outside of Greece. Within the EU (and other countries that ratified PDO agreements or similar laws) the name is protected with PDO status, which means that the name can only be used for olives (and olive oil) from the region around Kalamata. Olives of the same variety grown elsewhere are marketed as Kalamon olives in the EU and, sometimes, elsewhere.	Kalamata olives
Κασέρι / Kasseri	Thessaly	Kasseri (Greek: κασέρι, Turkish: kaşar) is a medium-hard or hard pale yellow cheese made from pasteurised or unpasteurised sheep milk and at most 20% goat's milk. "Kasseri" is a protected designation of origin, according to which the cheese must be made in the Greek provinces of Thessaly, Macedonia, Lesbos or Xanthi, but a similar type of cheese is found in Turkey, Romania, and the Balkans, where it is known as kashkaval. The same cheese is made with cow's milk, but in that case it cannot be legally sold as "kasseri" in the EU and is instead sold under names that are particular to each producer.	
Κεφαλογραβιέρα / Kefalograviera	Western Macedonia	Kefalograviera (Greek: Κεφαλογραβιέρα) is a hard table cheese produced traditionally from sheep's milk or mixture of sheep's and goat's milk. According to the PDO filing with the EU (see below) the name applies only to cheese produced in Western Macedonia, Epirus, and the regional units of Aetolia-Acarnania and Evrytania. The cheese has a salty flavour and rich aroma. It is often used in a Greek dish called Saganaki, cut into triangular pieces, rolled in seasoned flour and lightly fried. It is an excellent cheese for grating, and is widely used as a topping for pasta dishes. According to one cookbook, "At its best, it is as good as or better than Romano or aged Asiago." It is very similar to Kefalotyri cheese and sometimes is sold under that name. Kefalograviera has PDO status.	
Κοπανιστή / Kopanisti	Cyclades	Kopanisti (Greek: Κοπανιστή) is a salty, spicy cheese, with protected designation of origin (PDO) produced in the Greek islands of the Cyclades in the Aegean Sea such as Mykonos, Tinos, Andros, Syros, Naxos etc.; it has been produced in Mykonos for more than 300 years. It owes its special peppery and spicy taste to rapid and extensive lipolysis and proteolysis caused by abundant microbial growth encouraged by repeated kneadings performed during the ripening process.	Κοπανιστή
Λαδοτύρι Μυτιλήνης / Ladotyri Mytilinis	Greece	Ladotyri Mytilinis (Greek: Λαδοτύρι Μυτιλήνης) is a traditionally prepared Protected Designation of Origin (PDO) cheese from Greece, preserved in extra virgin olive oil. It is made on the island of Lesbos in the Northern Aegean Islands, and has been produced since ancient times. The cheese is made with ovine milk or with a mixture of ovine and caprine milk, the latter of which should not exceed 30%. The official designation for this hard table cheese notes the following production method: "The milk is coagulated with added rennet at 32–34 deg C in 30 minutes. The curd is then broken up and reheated to 45 deg C. Most of the whey is then removed and the curds are pressed in the bottom of the vat to form a compact mass. This is cut into pieces weighing between 5 and 7 kilos. The pieces are then placed on a bench and cut again to their final cheese size. They are then placed in special moulds, firmly pressed by hand, salted and taken to a ripening room where they remain for not less than 3 months." PDO status was granted on 12 June 1996 by the European Union, following Ministerial Decision No. 313058 in Greece, dated 18 January 1994.	
Μανούρι / Manouri	Macedonia	Manouri (μανούρι) is a Greek semi-soft, fresh white mixed milk-whey cheese made from goat or sheep milk as a by-product following the production of feta. It is produced primarily in Thessalia and Macedonia in central and northern Greece. Manouri is creamier than feta, because of the addition of cream to the whey. It has about 36–38% fat, but only 0.8% salt content, making it much less salty than feta. It is used in salads, pastries, or as a dessert cheese. It can be substituted for cream cheese in dishes such as cheesecake. Manouri was featured in the Washington Post: "Manouri's light aroma is slightly sour, similar to that of fresh yogurt, but it lacks yogurt's (or feta's) acidity. Instead, it has a clean, subtle nutty flavor with a bit of sheepiness and the barest hint of tang. What really elevates the cheese, though, is its texture." Manouri has PDO status.	Manouri
Μαστίχα Χίου / Masticha Chiou	Chios	Masticha Chiou (Greek: Μαστίχα Χίου) is a resin obtained from the mastic tree (Pistacia lentiscus). It is also known as tears of Chios, being traditionally produced on the island Chios, and, like other natural resins, is produced in "tears" or droplets. Mastic is excreted by the resin glands of certain trees and dries into pieces of brittle, translucent resin. When chewed, the resin softens and becomes a bright white and opaque gum. The flavor is bitter at first, but after some chewing, it releases a refreshing flavor similar to pine and cedar.	Mastic tears
Μέλι Ελάτης Μαινάλου Βανίλια / Meli Elatis Menalou Vanilia	Greece	Menalou vanilia fir honey (Greek: Μέλι Ελάτης Βανίλια Μαινάλου) is a honey produced in Greece with protected destination of origin status. It contains at least 80% honey of the which will be from the black pine, and the rest will be flower honey produced in the region (<20%) with a pleasant taste and a characteristic appearance with a light colour and sheen; moisture content 14–15.5%, sucrose content <10% (8–18%). It is produced in 24 municipalities and communities within Arcadia (district of Gortynia and Mantineia; the municipalities of Dimitsana and Lagkadia; the communities of Valtesiniko, Vytina, Elati, Zigovisti, Kamenitsa, Lasta, Magouliana, Mygdalia, Nymfasia, Pyrgaki, Rados, Stemnitsa, Syrna, Alonistaina, Vlacherna, Kardaras, Kapsas, Lykochia, Piana, Roeino, Tselepakos, and Chrysovitsi.	
Μετσοβόνε / Metsovone	Greece	Metsovone (Greek: Μετσοβόνε) is a semi-hard smoked pasta filata cheese produced in the region of Metsovo (Epirus, Greece). Metsovone has been a European protected designation of origin since 1996. Metsovone is manufactured from cow's milk or a mixture of cow and sheep or goat milk.	Μετσοβόνε
Ρόδι Ερμιόνης / Rodi Ermionis	Peloponnese	Rodi Ermionis (Greek: Ρόδι Ερμιόνης) is a pomegranate, fruit of the Ermioni pomegranate tree, a local variety grown in the Ermionida area in the Peloponnese, Greece, which has been granted a Protected Designation of Origin designation. The ripe fruit has a round shape with a thin, fleshy, elastic and shiny skin, with the inside having arils that contain a soft, medium-sized, semi-woody seed that breaks easily with chewing. The color of the peel varies from pale yellow-pink to red (depending on the surface exposed to the sun) while the arils have a color that varies from pink to red. The Rodi Ermionis PDO can be applied to both the fresh fruit or to the hulled and packaged arils.	
Τοματάκι Σαντορίνης / Tomataki Santorinis	Santorini	The Santorini tomato 'τοματάκι Σαντορίνης' (tomataki Santorinis) is a variety of cherry tomato from Santorini, Greece. Santorinis have a deep red color and have firm, not particularly moist flesh with a high seed content. They are known for their high carbohydrate content and a sweet, strongly acidic taste. They have a round, slightly flattened shape and weigh 15–27 grams. They often have pronounced flutes, especially those growing lowest on the plant. The fruits generally ripen in 80–90 days. The Santorini tomato has been protected with an official designation of origin since June 13, 2013.	
Ξυνομυζήθρα Κρήτης / Xynomyzithra Kritis	Crete	Xynomizithra or xynomyzithra (Greek: Ξινομυζήθρα) is a Greek whey cheese with some added milk; it is a sour variant of Mizithra, and made from ewes' or goats' milk. The proportion of full-cream milk is about 15%. It is mainly produced on the island of Crete but other areas in Greece also produce it. Xynomyzithra Kritis (xynomizithra of Crete) is a European protected designation of origin.	

== Iceland ==
Product name	Area	Short description	Image
Íslenskt lambakjöt	Iceland	‘Íslenskt lambakjöt’ is the name given to the meat from pure bred Icelandic lambs, which have been born, raised and slaughtered in the island of Iceland in North Atlantic Ocean. The meat is dark red, tender with gamey flavor. The lamb may be marketed as a whole carcass or primal cuts (forequarter, rack, fillet, leg, chops, shanks etc.), fresh or frozen	

== Ireland ==
Product name	Area	Short description	Image
Imokilly Regato	Ireland	Imokilly Regato (Irish: Reigeató Uí Mhic Coille) is a cows' milk hard cheese made in Mogeely, County Cork, Ireland.The cheese takes its name from Imokilly, an ancient barony in Ireland, now a region in the east of County Cork. It is made from pasteurised milk by the Imokilly Cheese Company, part of the Dairygold cooperative, at its Mogeely specialty cheese facility. The cheese was granted Protected Designation of Origin (PDO) status under European Union law in 1999.	
Oriel Sea Minerals	Ireland	Oriel Sea Minerals (Irish: Mianraí Mara Oirialla) is a variety of Irish sea minerals. Oriel Sea Minerals are concentrated sea mineral salts in liquid form and are harvested from the Irish Sea by Oriel Marine Extracts. They are harvested from the bay of Port Oriel near Drogheda. Oriel Sea Minerals received Protected designation of origin in 2016.	Sign in Port Oriel, near Clogherhead
Oriel Sea Salt		Oriel Sea Salt (Irish: salann sáile Oirialla) is a variety of Irish sea salt. Oriel Sea Salt was established at Port Oriel, Clogherhead in 2010 by Brian Fitzpatrick and John Delany. It extracts and harvests salt and minerals from Irish Sea seawater. It describes itself as "the only non-oxidised sea salt on the planet": the seawater is pumped from the seabed without being exposed to air, resulting in a naturally white salt with a fine powdery grain and a "smooth depth of flavour." They received Protected designation of origin in 2016.	Sign in Port Oriel, near Clogherhead

== Italy ==
Product name	Area	Short description	Image
Aprutino Pescarese	Province of Pescara	Aprutino Pescarese is a Protected Designation of Origin (PDO) olive oil, produced in the province of Pescara, in the region of Abruzzo. It is among the first group of Italian extra virgin olive oils to be registered as PDO.	
Asiago	Asiago	Asiago is a cow's milk cheese, first produced in Italy, that can assume different textures according to its aging, from smooth for the fresh Asiago (called Asiago Pressato, which means "Pressed Asiago") to a crumbly texture for the aged cheese (Asiago d'allevo, which means "Breeding farm Asiago"). The aged cheese is often grated in salads, soups, pastas, and sauces while the fresh Asiago is sliced to prepare panini or sandwiches; it can also be melted on a variety of dishes and cantaloupe. It is classified as a Swiss-type or Alpine cheese. Asiago is produced in multiple countries around the world including Italy, the U.S. and Australia. In Italy, Asiago has a protected designation of origin (Denominazione di Origine Protetta or DOP, see below), as asiago was originally produced around the alpine area of the Asiago Plateau, in the regions of Veneto and Trentino-Alto Adige. Asiago cheese is one of the most typical products of the Veneto region. It was, and still is, the most popular and widely used cheese in the DOP area where it is produced. The DOP production area is strictly defined: It starts from the meadows of the Po Valley and finishes in the Alpine pastures between the Asiago Plateau and the Trentino's highlands. The DOP designated area where the milk is collected and Asiago DOP cheese is produced extends to four provinces in the north-east of Italy: the entire area of Vicenza and Trento and part of the provinces of Padua and Treviso. Asiago cheese, which is produced and matured in dairies located more than 600 m (2,000 ft) above sea level, using milk from farms also more than 600 m (2,000 ft) above sea level, is entitled to the additional label "Product of the Mountains". Over time, production of asiago was initiated in other countries as well, particularly those with a history of notable immigration from Italy. As such, production of the cheese has spread around the globe and the term "asiago" describes a style of cheese that can be produced anywhere.	Formaggio Asiago DOP
Bitto	Valtelline	Bitto (Lombard: Bit) is an Italian DOP (Denominazione di Origine Protetta) cheese produced in the Valtelline valley in Lombardy. It owes its name to the Bitto river. Bitto is produced only in the summer months when the cows feed on the high alpine meadows. The cheese received the DOP (Protected Denomination of Origin) recognition in 1996, with a less restrictive product specification than the traditional one. Since then, another version of Bitto, called Bitto Storico (Historical Bitto), has been produced by means of traditional methods and promoted by Slow Food (Slow movement). In September 2016 Bitto Storico changed its name to Bitto ribelle.	Bitto DOP
Bra	Bra	The Italian cheese Bra originates from the town of Bra in province of Cuneo, in the region of Piemonte. Production of Bra may take place all year, but it may only legally take place within the province of Cuneo. However, aging may also take place in Villafranca, in province of Turin. The cheese may use either unpasteurized or pasteurized milk, often entirely cow's milk, but goat's or sheep's milk may be added in small amounts. It may be served as a soft or hard cheese, depending on the length of aging, from at least forty five days for soft cheese, to six months for hard cheese. Bra has PDO status under European Law.	Bra Duro cheese
Bruzio	Cosenza	Bruzio olive oil is a Protected Designation of Origin (PDO) product, as of European regulation Reg. CEE 2081/92 and Reg. CE n.1065/97.	
Mozzarella di Bufala Campana	Campania	Mozzarella di Bufala Campana (Neapolitan: muzzarella 'e vufera) is a mozzarella made from the milk of Italian Mediterranean buffalo. It is a dairy product traditionally manufactured in Campania, especially in the provinces of Caserta and Salerno. The term mozzarella derives from the procedure called mozzare, which means "cutting by hand", separating from the curd, and serving in individual pieces, that is, the process of separation of the curd into small balls. It is appreciated for its versatility and elastic texture and often called "the queen of the Mediterranean cuisine", "white gold" or "the pearl of the table". The buffalo mozzarella sold as mozzarella di bufala campana has been granted the status of Denominazione di origine controllata (DOC – "Controlled designation of origin") since 1993. Since 1996 it is also protected under the EU's Protected Designation of Origin or DOP Denominazione di origine protetta scheme. The protected origin's appellation requires that it may only be produced with a traditional recipe in select locations in the regions of Campania, Lazio, Apulia and Molise.	Mozzarella di bufala
Caciocavallo silano	Southern Italy	Caciocavallo is a type of stretched-curd cheese made out of sheep's or cow's milk. It is produced throughout Southern Italy, particularly in the Apennine Mountains and in the Gargano peninsula. Shaped like a teardrop, it is similar in taste to the aged Southern Italian Provolone cheese, with a hard edible rind. Apparently caciocavallo was mentioned the first time around 500 BC by Hippocrates, emphasising the "Greeks' cleverness in making cheese". Columella in his classic treatise on agriculture, De re rustica (35–45 CE), described precisely the methods used in its preparation, making it one of the oldest known cheeses in the world. Types of cheese with names similar to "caciocavallo" are common throughout the Balkans and Southern Italy (Eastern Mediterranean). In Sicily, the Ragusano DOP, known locally as caciocavallo ragusano had to drop the denomination "caciocavallo" in order to get DOP status.	Caciocavallo
Capocollo di Calabria	Calabria	Capocollo di Calabria or coppa (in the U.S. gabagool or capicola) is a traditional Italian and Corsican pork cold cut (salume) made from the dry-cured muscle running from the neck to the fourth or fifth rib of the pork shoulder or neck. It is a whole-muscle salume, dry cured, and typically sliced very thin. It is similar to the more widely known cured ham or prosciutto, because they are both pork-derived cold-cuts used in similar dishes. It is not brined as ham typically is.	Coppa de Corse – coppa di Corsica
Casciotta d'Urbino	Urbino	Casciotta d'Urbino or Casciotta di Urbino is a type of caciotta cheese, made in the province of Pesaro and Urbino in the Marche region, central Italy. This cheese is generally made of between 70 and 80% sheep milk with 20–30% cow's milk. First made in ancient times, this cheese, it is said was a favourite of Michelangelo and Pope Clement XIV. Local legend has it that the name came about from a mis-pronunciation of "caciotta" by a local civil servant; some say it is derived from the local dialect.	
Castelmagno	Piedmont	Castelmagno (DOP) is an Italian cheese from the north-west Italian region Piedmont. It has a Protected Designation of Origin status in the European Union.	Formaggio Castelmagno
Cinta Senese	Province of Siena	The Cinta Senese is a breed of domestic pig from the province of Siena, in Tuscany, central Italy Since 2006 animals raised in Tuscany have had DOP status, and are officially named Suino Cinto Toscano DOP. The Cinta Senese is one of the six autochthonous pig breeds recognised by the Ministero delle Politiche Agricole Alimentari e Forestali, the Italian ministry of agriculture and forestry. The Cinta Senese is particularly associated with the Montagnola Senese and the comuni of Casole d'Elsa, Castelnuovo Berardenga, Gaiole in Chianti, Monteriggioni, Siena and Sovicille, in the area between the upper Merse and the upper Elsa rivers. It was in the past widely distributed throughout Tuscany. A genealogical herdbook was established in the early 1930s. The population fell drastically after the Second World War, almost to the point of extinction, and the herdbook was discontinued in the 1960s. Following a recent recovery in numbers, the herdbook was re-opened in 1997, and is kept by the Associazione Nazionale Allevatori Suini, the Italian national association of pig breeders. The population remains low: at the end of 2007 it was 2867; the conservation status of the breed was listed as "endangered" by the FAO in the same year. At the end of 2012 there were 2543 pigs registered, distributed over 111 farms.	Cinta Senese piglets
Culatello di Zibello	Zibello	Culatello di Zibello is similar to prosciutto but is made from the filet or loin of the hind leg. It is cured primarily with salt only and aged in a beef or hogs bladder as a casing to prevent spoilage and contamination. Culatello di Zibello possesses PDO status. It is commonly served as a starter. Strolghino is a salame prepared from leftover cuts of culatello.	Culatello
Fontina	Aosta Valley	Fontina (French: fontine) is a cow's milk cheese, first produced in Italy. Over time, production of Fontina has spread worldwide, including the United States, Denmark, Sweden, Quebec, France and Argentina. Fontina produced in the Aosta Valley must be made from unpasteurized milk from a single milking, with two batches being made per day. A 1480 fresco from the Issogne Castle: the forms of cheese on the right are thought to be the earliest depiction of fontina. The original fontina cheese from the Aosta Valley is fairly pungent and has quite an intense flavor, although fontina-like labeled cheeses that are produced in other countries can be much milder. Aostan fontina has a natural rind due to aging, which is usually tan to orange-brown. The interior of the cheese is pale cream in color and riddled with holes known as "eyes". It is noted for its earthy, mushroomy, and woody taste, and pairs exceptionally well with roast meats and truffles. It has a rich and creamy flavor, which gets nuttier with aging. Mature fontina is a hard cheese, and melts well. Fontina cheese sold in the EU can be identified by a Consorzio (Consortium) stamp of the Matterhorn including the script "FONTINA". Cheese produced in the Aosta Valley has a Protected Designation of Origin (DOP) with regulations that the cheese must be made from unpasteurized milk from a single milking, of a Valdostana breed of cow, with two batches being made per day.	Fontina PDO
Formaggio di Fossa di Sogliano	Sogliano al Rubicone	Formaggio di Fossa di Sogliano is a cheese from Sogliano al Rubicone in the Emilia-Romagna region of Italy. The cheese's name, which literally means "cheese of the pit", is derived from the process of ripening the cheese in special pits dug in tuff rock. The cheese is currently produced in the areas between the Rubicon and Marecchia river valleys. In 2009 formaggio di fossa was granted Denominazione di Origine Protetta status, the Italian equivalent of Protected Designation of Origin (PDO).	Formaggio di fossa
Formai de Mut dell'Alta Valle Brembana	Lombardy	Formai de Mut dell'Alta Valle Brembana is an Italian cheese prepared from raw cow's milk that originated in Lombardy, Italy. It is prepared in a similar manner to Fontina cheese at Alta Valle Brembana in high pasture lands and in Bergamo, Lombardy. It is rarely found outside of Lombardy, and it is produced in "very limited quantities". It was classified with a protected designation of origin status in 1996.	Formai de mut
Nocellara del Belice	Valle del Belice	Nocellara del Belice is an olive cultivar from the Valle del Belice area of south-western Sicily. It is a dual-purpose olive, grown both for oil and for the table. It is used to make "Valle del Belìce" extra-virgin olive oil, which is pressed from a minimum of 70% Nocellara del Belice olives. As a table olive it may be treated by various methods, one of which is named for the comune of Castelvetrano in the Valle del Belice; these may be marketed as Castelvetrano olives in the United States and elsewhere, and are large, green olives with a mild, buttery flavor. The Nocellara del Belice olive has two DOP protections: both Valle del Belìce DOP olive oil and Nocellara del Belice DOP table olives have protected status in the European Union. Nocellara del Belice olives are grown primarily in Sicily, but also in India, Pakistan and South Africa.	Nocellara del Belice table olives
Pane di Altamura	Altamura	Pane di Altamura is a type of Italian naturally leavened bread made from remilled durum wheat semola from the Altamura area of the Provincia di Bari, in the Apulia region. In 2003 Pane di Altamura was granted PDO status within Europe. By law, it must be produced according to a range of strict conditions, including using particular varieties of durum wheat (all locally produced), a certain specification of water, a consistent production method, and must also have a final crust that is at least 3 mm thick. The shape of the bread is not essential for a loaf to be certified, but there are some traditional shapes.	Pane di Altamura DOP
Parmigiano Reggiano	Emilia-Romagna	Parmigiano Reggiano is an Italian hard, granular cheese produced from cow's milk and aged at least 12 months. It is named after the producing areas, the provinces of Reggio Emilia, Parma, the part of Bologna west of the Reno, and Modena (all in Emilia-Romagna); and the part of Mantua (Lombardy) on the right/south bank of the Po. Parmigiano is the Italian adjective for Parma and Reggiano that for Reggio Emilia. Both Parmigiano Reggiano and "Parmesan" are protected designations of origin (PDO) for cheeses produced in these provinces under Italian and European law. Outside the EU, the name "Parmesan" can legally be used for similar cheeses, with only the full Italian name unambiguously referring to PDO Parmigiano Reggiano. It has been called the "King of Cheeses" and a "practically perfect food".	Parmigiano Reggiano meules MIN Rungis
Pecorino di Filiano	Basilicata	Pecorino di Filiano is a firm cheese from the Italian region of Basilicata made from sheep milk. It was granted protected designation of Origin (PDO) in 2007. Pecorino di Filiano is produced in the province of Potenza, in the communes of Atella, Avigliano, Balvano, Baragiano, Barile, Bella, Cancellara, Castelgrande, Filiano, Forenza, Ginestra, Maschito, Melfi, Muro Lucano, Pescopagano, Picerno, Pietragalla, Pignola, Potenza, Rapolla, Rapone, Rionero in Vulture, Ripacandida, Ruoti, Ruvo del Monte, San Fele, Savoia di Lucania, Tito, Vaglio, Vietri di Potenza. Every year on the first Sunday of September in Filiano is organized the pecorino di Filiano festival, where the cheese, produced by various farmers, is available to taste and buy.	Pecorino di Filiano
Pecorino romano	Central Italy	Pecorino romano is a hard, salty Italian cheese, often used for grating, made with sheep's milk. The name "pecorino" simply means "ovine" or "of sheep" in Italian; the name of the cheese, although protected, is a simple description rather than a brand: "[formaggio] pecorino romano" is simply "sheep's [cheese] of Rome". Even though this variety of cheese originated in Lazio, as the name also indicates, most of its actual production has moved to the island of Sardinia. Pecorino romano is an Italian product with name recognized and protected by the laws of the European Community. Pecorino romano was a staple in the diet for the legionaries of ancient Rome. Today, it is still made according to the original recipe and is one of Italy's oldest cheeses. On the first of May, Roman families traditionally eat pecorino with fresh fava beans during a daily excursion in the Roman Campagna. It is mostly used in Central and Southern Italy.	Pecorino romano cheese
Pecorino sardo	Sardinia	Pecorino sardo (Sardinian: berveghinu sardu), is a firm cheese from the Italian island of Sardinia, which is made from sheep milk: specifically from the milk of the local Sardinian breed. It was awarded. Denominazione d'Origine status in 1991 and granted Protected Designation of Origin (PDO in English and DOP in Italian) protection in 1996, the year in which this European Union certification scheme was introduced. Pecorino sardo is an uncooked hard cheese made from fresh whole sheep's milk curdled using lamb or kid rennet. The mixture is poured into moulds that will give the cheese its characteristic shape. After a brief period in brine, the moulds are lightly smoked and left to ripen in cool cellars in central Sardinia. The average weight of the finished product is 3.5 kg (7.7 lb): sometimes a bit more, sometimes a bit less depending on the conditions of manufacture. The rind varies from deep yellow to dark brown in colour and encases a paste that varies from white to straw-yellow. The sharpness of the flavour depends on the length of maturation. The young pecorino sardo is about a couple of months old; the mature type is more than six months old and needs strictly controlled temperature and humidity. In the United States it is most often found as a hard cheese, its more mature form. Pecorino sardo is not as well known outside Italy as romano or pecorino romano, although a good deal of pecorino romano is actually made in Sardinia, as Sardinia is within romano's PDO area. Pecorino sardo can be processed further into casu martzu by the introduction of cheese fly maggots.	Pecorino sardo DOP
Pecorino siciliano	Sicily	Pecorino siciliano DOP (Sicilian: picurinu sicilianu) is an origin-protected firm sheep milk cheese from the Italian island and region of Sicily. This cheese comes from the classical Greek world: in ancient times it was recognized as one of the best cheeses in the world. It is produced throughout the island, but especially in the provinces of Agrigento, Caltanissetta, Enna, Trapani and Palermo. It is a pecorino-style cheese, like its close relation pecorino romano, but not as well known outside Italy as the latter. A semi-hard white cheese, it has a cylindrical shape and a weight of about 12 kg (26 lb). The cheese was awarded with Denominazione di Origine Protetta in 1955 and EU protected designation of origin status in 1996.	
Pecorino toscano	Tuscany	Pecorino toscano (Tuscan pecorino) is a firm-textured ewe's milk cheese produced in Tuscany. Since 1996 it has enjoyed protected designation of origin (PDO) status.	Pecorino Rosso volterrano one quarter on whole
Piave	Province of Belluno	Piave is an Italian cow's milk cheese, that is named after the Piave river. As Piave has a Protected Designation of Origin (Denominazione di Origine Protetta or DOP), the only "official" Piave is produced in the Dolomites area, province of Belluno, in the northernmost tip of the Veneto region.	
Pomodorino del Piennolo del Vesuvio	Naples	The pomodorino del Piennolo del Vesuvio or sometimes just pomodorino vesuviano, is a grape tomato grown in Naples, Italy, and has PDO protected status, which was granted in 2009. The cultivation area is restricted to 18 comuni around Mount Vesuvius, pretty much all within the Vesuvius National Park.	A batch of the pomodorini
Prosciutto di Parma	Emilia-Romagna	Prosciutto di Parma is an Italian dry-cured ham produced in Emilia-Romagna that is usually thinly sliced and served uncooked; this style is called prosciutto crudo in Italian (or simply crudo) and is distinguished from cooked ham, prosciutto cotto. Unlike Italian Speck, based on the South Tyrol region and also known as Speck Alto Adige PGI, which is also a dry-cured ham, prosciutto is not smoked. The names prosciutto and prosciutto crudo are generic, and not protected designations, and may name or describe a variety of hams more or less similar to Italian prosciutto crudo or other dry-cured hams worldwide.	Prosciutto di Parma
Provolone Valpadana	Casilli	Provolone Valpadana is an Italian cheese. It is an aged pasta filata (stretched-curd) cheese originating in Casilli near Vesuvius, where it is still produced in pear, sausage, or cone shapes 10 to 15 cm (4 to 6 in) long. Provolone-type cheeses are also produced in other countries. The most important provolone production region today is Northwestern Italy and the city of Cremona. Provolone, provola, and provoleta are versions of the same basic cheese. Some versions of provolone are smoked.	Provolone dolce
Quartirolo lombardo	Lombardy	Quartirolo lombardo (Lombard: quartiroeul lombard) is a soft table cheese made with cow's milk, which has a Protected Designation of Origin (PDO) status. The beginning of its production dates back to the 10th century. Its production was seasonal, the cheese was made at the end of the summer with the milk of cows that had eaten erba quartirola ("grass of the fourth"), that is the grass that had grown again after the third cut. Nowadays, it is made all year around, it has been recognised by the European Economic Community and registered in the PDP list with ECC Reg. n. 1107/96.	Quartirolo lombardo
Ragusano	Ragusa	Ragusano is an Italian cow's-milk cheese produced in Ragusa, in Sicily in southern Italy. It is a firm stretched-curd (pasta filata) cheese made with whole milk from cows of the Modicana breed, raised exclusively on fresh grass or hay in the provinces of Ragusa and Syracuse. The cheese was awarded Italian Denominazione di Origine Controllata protection in 1955 and EU DOP status in 1995.	Formaggio Ragusano
Raschera	Cuneo	Raschera is an Italian pressed fat or medium fat, semi-hard cheese made with raw or pasteurized cow milk, to which a small amount of sheep or goat milk may be added. It has an ivory white color inside with irregularly spaced small eyes, and a semi-hard rind which is red gray sometimes with yellow highlights. It has a savory and salty taste, similar to Muenster cheese, and can be moderately sharp if the cheese has been aged. The cheese was given an Italian Protected Designation of Origin (DOP) in July 1996, and may also carry the name "di alpeggio" (from mountain pasture) if the cheese was made in the mountainous areas of its designated province of Cuneo.	Fetta di Raschera
Robiola di Roccaverano	Langhe	Robiola di Roccaverano is an Italian soft-ripened cheese of the Stracchino family. It is from the Langhe region and made with varying proportions of cow's, goat's, and sheep's milk. One theory is that the cheese gets its name from the town of Robbio in the province of Pavia; another that the name comes from the word rubeole ("ruddy") because of the color of the seasoned rind. Varieties of Robiola are produced across Piedmont from the provinces of Cuneo, Asti and Alessandria and into Lombardy. It is one of the specialties of the Aosta Valley. The taste and appearance of Robiola varies depending upon where it was produced. Robiola di Roccaverano DOP / DOC has no rind and a slightly straw-yellow coloring with a sweet, yielding taste. Robiola Lombardia has a thin, milky-white to pink rind and tends to be shaped like small rolls. The cream-colored cheese underneath its bloomy rind has a smooth, full, tangy and mildly sour flavor, likely due to the high (52%) fat content. Its rind can be cut away, but is mild with no ammonia and adds a subtle crunch to the cheese. La Tur has a cake-like rind over a tangy-lactic layer of cream and is representative of Piedmont's Robiola style of cheese where the fresh curds are ladled into molds, and drain under their own weight before aging rather than by pressing with weights. Robiola from the Piedmont region is a fresh cheese, and is usually eaten on its own, or with a little honey.	Robiola di Roccaverano
Sabina	Province of Rome	Sabina is a Protected Designation of Origin (PDO) that applies to the extra virgin olive oil produced in the Sabina region. This area approximately covers the territory originally occupied by the ancient Sabines tribe in the Province of Rome and the Province of Rieti. It is considered to be the first Italian PDO to gain the status, later being followed by Aprutino Pescarese, Brisighella, Collina di Brindisi and Canino. The production area of the PDO extra virgin olive oil is mainly in two provinces, Rieti and Rome, and follows the borders of the ancient Sabine territory. Techniques used to produce the oil are almost the same as in pre-Roman times with necessary technological innovations. For the production of the extra virgin olive oil Sabina, the soil and the mild climate are of fundamental importance.	
Salva Cremasco	Crema	Salva Cremasco is a table cow's milk cheese made with raw curd in Crema. It is a washed-rind cheese that undergoes a medium or long aging period. Salva is traditionally eaten in the central plain of Lombardy and produced particularly in the area of Crema, Bergamo, and Brescia. It is also produced in the provinces of Lecco, Lodi, and Milan. Salva has many similarities to Quartirolo, though differs from it by having longer aging and a major aromatic complexity.	
Pomodoro San Marzano dell'agro sarnese-nocerino	Valle del Sarno	Pomodoro San Marzano dell'agro sarnese-nocerino is a variety of plum tomato. Amy P. Goldman calls the San Marzano "the most important industrial tomato of the 20th century"; its commercial introduction in 1926 provided canneries with a "sturdy, flawless subject, and breeders with genes they'd be raiding for decades". Though commercial production of the San Marzano variety is most closely associated with Italy, seeds for the variety are available worldwide. It is an heirloom variety. Canned San Marzanos, when grown in the Valle del Sarno ("valley of the Sarno") in Italy in compliance with Italian law, can be classified as pomodoro San Marzano dell'agro sarnese-nocerino and have the EU "DOP" emblem on the label. Most San Marzano tomatoes sold commercially are grown in Italy, though they are produced commercially in smaller quantities in other countries. Because of San Marzano's premium pricing, there is an ongoing battle against fraudulent product. On 22 November 2010, the Italian Carabinieri confiscated 1,470 tonnes (1,450 long tons; 1,620 short tons) of improperly labelled canned tomatoes worth €1.2 million. San Marzano tomatoes, along with pomodorino del Piennolo del Vesuvio, have been designated as the only tomatoes that can be used for Vera pizza napoletana ("true Neapolitan pizza").	Pomodori San Marzano
Silter	Province of Brescia	Silter is an Italian hard cheese made within the Alpine Lombardy region around Province of Brescia and surrounding areas and traditionally produced with unpasteurised cows milk during summer months and September, is brined, and aged for a minimum of six months. As of 2015, within the EU, it has PDO certification.	
Soprèssa vicentina	Vicenza	Soprèssa vicentina is an Italian aged salami, produced with pork, lard, salt, pepper, spices and garlic. It is a typical product of Veneto, in northern Italy. The sopressa is a salami, typical of the Venetian culinary tradition. The PDO requirements are governed through the "Consorzio di Tutela della Soprèssa Vicentina DOP", which brings together four local producers scattered around Vicenza.	Polenta con sopressa e funghi
Spressa delle Giudicarie	Trentino-Alto Adige/Südtirol	Spressa delle Giudicarie is an Italian cheese that comes from the region of Trentino-Alto Adige/Südtirol. The Spressa delle Giudicarie can be consumed fresh after three months, while curing takes more than six months. The cheese is made in cylindrical shape, about 25 cm (9.8 in) in diameter. The crust is brown, the interior of the cheese is white to very pale yellow with small to medium-sized holes. The cheese is eaten when still young. It is a cow's milk cheese Rendena race mostly, from two milkings, the evening and the morning. Originally, the milk was used to make butter. The skimmed milk that remained was used for cheeses. It pairs well with local wine, as Marzemino, red wine DOC from southern Trentino.	
Taleggio	Val Taleggio	Taleggio is a semisoft, washed-rind, smear-ripened Italian cheese that is named after Val Taleggio. The cheese has a thin crust and a strong aroma, but its flavour is comparatively mild with an unusual fruity tang. Taleggio and similar cheeses have been around since Roman times, with Cicero, Cato the Elder, and Pliny the Elder all mentioning it in their writings. The cheese was solely produced in the Val Taleggio until the late 1800s, when some production moved to the Lombardy plain to the south.	Taleggio vecchia lavorazione
Terra d'Otranto	Terra d'Otranto	The extra-virgin olive oil Terra d'Otranto is produced with the olive cultivars Cellina di Nardò and Ogliarola for, at least, 60%. They are mixed with other minor varieties of the local olive groves. Its name is linked with the historical region of Terra d'Otranto which included almost all the municipalities of the current provinces of Taranto, Brindisi and Lecce. It is recognised as PDO product.	
Terre Tarentine	Taranto	The extra-virgin olive oil Terre Tarentine is produced with the olive cultivars Leccino and Coratina and Ogliarola for, at least, 80%. They are mixed with other minor varieties of the local olive groves. It is recognised as PDO product.	Extra-virgin olive oil Terre Tarentine
Toma piemontese	Aosta Valley	Toma piemontese is a soft or semi-hard Italian cow's milk cheese, noted for its excellent melting qualities. Toma is made primarily in the Aosta Valley (it is one of the region's specialties) and Piedmont regions of Northwestern Italy. The Toma piemontese is the Toma variety from Piedmont. It can have a fat content of 45%–52%.	Toma piemontese DOP
Aceto balsamico tradizionale di Modena	Modena	Aceto balsamico tradizionale di Modena ("Traditional balsamic vinegar") is a type of balsamic vinegar produced in Modena and the wider Emilia-Romagna region of Italy. Unlike less expensive "Balsamic Vinegar of Modena" (BVM, which is a Protected Geographical Indication, PGI), Traditional Balsamic Vinegar (TBV) is produced from cooked grape must, aged at least 12 years, and protected as a PDO, fetching higher prices. (BVM has lesser protection under the European Protected Geographical Indication (PGI) system.) Although the names are similar, TBV and the inexpensive imitation BVM are very different.	Barrels during aging
Valle d'Aosta Fromadzo	Aosta Valley	Valle d'Aosta Fromadzo or Vallée d'Aoste Fromadzo is an Italian cow's milk cheese produced in the Aosta Valley, one of the region's specialties. It has a protected designation of origin, or PDO status.	
Valle d'Aosta Jambon de Bosses	Aosta Valley	Valle d'Aosta Jambon de Bosses is a spicy cured ham product from Saint-Rhémy-en-Bosses in the Aosta Valley in Italy, one of the region's specialties. It was awarded European Union protected designation of origin (PDO) status.	
Vallée d'Aoste Lard d'Arnad		Vallée d'Aoste Lard d'Arnad or is a variety of lardo (a cured pork product) produced exclusively within the municipal boundaries of the commune of Arnad in lower Aosta Valley, Italy. It was awarded European Union Protected Designation of Origin (PDO) status in 1996 and is promoted by the Comité pour la valorisation des produits typiques d'Arnad – Lo Doil producers association. The lard, one of a number of preserved meat specialties of the region, is produced by curing pieces of fatback in a brine aromatised with such herbs and spices as juniper, bay, nutmeg, sage and rosemary. The brining takes place in wooden tubs known as doïls, which may be made of chestnut, oak or larch, and are used solely for this purpose; it is known that Lard d'Arnad has been made for more than two centuries since a 1763 inventory from Arnad Castle refers to four doïls which belonged to its kitchens. It is often eaten with black bread and honey. The traditional Féhta dou lar (Arnad Francoprovençal patois for Lard Festival) is a Sagra held each year on the last Sunday of August. It has become a significant tourist attraction.	
Valtellina Casera	Valtellina	Valtellina Casera (Lombard: Casera de la Valtolina) is a cheese made from semi-skimmed cows' milk in the northern Italian province of Sondrio. Its origins date back to the sixteenth century and it is much used in the cuisine of the Valtellina: particularly in dishes based on buckwheat flour such as pizzoccheri and sciatt (toad(s) in Lombard language). It has had Protected designation of origin (PDO) status under European Union law since 1996; its production is managed by the Consorzio Tutela Formaggi Valtellina Casera e Bitto and certification is regulated by CSQA of Thiene.	Valtellina Casera DOP

== Latvia ==
Product name	Area	Short description	Image
Latvijas lielie pelēkie zirņi	Latvia	Latvijas lielie pelēkie zirņi (Latvian large grey peas) is a popular Latvian cuisine snack made from large grey peas. It is a traditional Christmas dish in Latvia. In 2015, it was registered as a PDO. Dried peas of the "Retria" variety are best for these pea dishes, which differ from other smaller grey peas in their impressive size – 1000 peas weigh 360–380 g. Although their number in pods is not large, it is compensated by good culinary properties – relatively short cooking time, good taste properties. The State Institute of Crop Production (Latvian: Valsts Priekuļu laukaugu selekcijas institūts) is probably the only place in the world where large grey peas are selected and grown for food. The "Retriver" breed was also created here. The quality of peas is influenced by the appropriate Latvian soil and climatic conditions.	Grey peas at restaurant Milda in Riga

== Luxembourg ==
Product name	Area	Short description	Image
Beurre rose – Marque nationale du Grand-Duché de Luxembourg	Luxembourg	"Beurre rose – Marque nationale du Grand-Duché de Luxembourg" is a cultured milk butter produced in Luxembourg under the Marque Nationale of the Grand Duchy of Luxembourg. It is sometimes consumed as a spread, but most commonly used as an ingredient in a variety of sweet and savory dishes. The designation "Beurre de Marque Nationale Luxembourgeois" was established in 1932 by specific legislation. In 1970, the legislation was amended to establish a national protected brand name for Luxembourg butter. It holds a PDO classification in Europe, which it received in 2000.	
Miel – Marque nationale du Grand-Duché de Luxembourg	Luxembourg	Miel – Marque nationale du Grand-Duché de Luxembourg is a honey from Luxembourg that is protected under EU law with PDO status.	

== Malta ==
Product name	Area	Short description	Image
Malta	Malta (island)	Malta or "of Malta" is a PDO wine from the island of Malta, which is produced and packaged there. The maximum yield is 84–91 hectoliter/hectare. It uses the national designation DOK (Denominazzjoni ta’ Origini Kontrollata).	
Gozo/Għawdex	Gozo	Gozo or of Gozo (Maltese: Għawdex or "Ta' Għawdex") is a PDO wine from the island of Gozo, with very similar requirement to those of "Malta".	A Gozo DOK Merlot wine

== Netherlands ==
Product name	Area	Short description	Image
Boeren-Leidse met sleutels	Western part of the Netherlands	Boeren-Leidse met sleutels (Farmers' Leiden with Keys) is a semi-hard cheese with a low fat content, made of unpasteurized milk and containing cumin seeds. The cheese was originally produced from the left-overs of butter-production near the city of Leiden. The cheese is coated with a red-brown cover showing two keys: the coat of arms of the city of Leiden.	Leiden cheese
Kanterkaas / Kanternagelkaas / Kanterkomijnekaas	Friesland and the Westerkwartier	Kanterkaas / Kanternagelkaas / Kanterkomijnekaas are a group of Dutch cheeses made from cow's milk. The plain variety is called Kanterkaas. Apart from the plain variety, there is Kanterkomijnekaas which is flavored with cumin and Kanternagelkaas flavored with both cumin and cloves. Kanter is Dutch for 'edge' and refers to the sharp angle at the point where the side of the cheese wheel meets the base. It was registered as a PDO in 2000.	
Mergelland	part of South Limburg	Mergelland is a wine produced on soil is composed of a layer of loess arable soil, with marl underneath. Several grapes are used for Mergelland wine: Riesling, Pinot noir, Pinot gris, Pinot blanc, Müller-Thurgau, Gewürztraminer, Dornfelder, Chardonnay and Auxerrois.	
Noord-Hollandse Gouda	Noord Holland	Noord Hollandse Gouda is a Gouda cheese from cow's milk Noord Holland using a specification which applies the 1911 Patent and Trade Mark Act for Cheese in addition to characteristics which are specific for the cheese.	
Rivierenland	along rivers in Gelderland	Rivierenland is a PDO for several types of wine (both white and red) produced from vineyards with a maximum production of 40–60 hectoliter/ha. It is produced in the province of Gelderland along the rivers Oude IJssel, IJssel, Nederrijn and Lek.	

== Poland ==
Product name	Area	Short description	Image
Bryndza Podhalańska	Podhale	Bryndza Podhalańska is a Polish variety of the soft cheese Bryndza, from the Podhale region, it is made from sheep's milk.	
Oscypek	Tatra Mountains	Oscypek (pronounced Os-tzipeck, Polish plural: oscypki), rarely Oszczypek, is a smoked cheese made of salted sheep milk exclusively in the Tatra Mountains region of Poland. Oscypek is made by an expert named "baca", a term also denoting a sheep shepherd in the mountains. The cheese is a traditional holiday cheese in some European countries and is often served with cranberry jam on the side. Since 14 February 2008 Oscypek has been registered as a PDO.	
Redykołka	Podhale	Redykołka is a type of cheese produced in the Podhale region of Poland. It is sometimes known as the "younger sister" of the Oscypek cheese and the two are occasionally confused. The cheese is often made in the shape of animals, hearts, or decorative wreaths.	Grilled redykołka with cranberry sauce

== Portugal ==
Product name	Area	Short description	Image
Carne Arouquesa	Portugal	Carne Arouquesa is meat from the Arouquesa: a cattle breed from Portugal. The Arouquesa breed was registered as a PDO in 1996.	Arouquesa bull
Bairrada	Beira Litoral Province	Bairrada is a wine from the eponymous Portuguese wine region located in the Beira Litoral Province. The region has Portugal's highest wine classification as a PDO, and its popularity has surged over the last years. It is using the designation Denominação de Origem Controlada (DOC), which preceded the use of PDO for wines. Bairada is small and quite narrow coastal region, part of the broader region of Beira Atlântico, and it is bordered to the northeast by the Lafões IPR and to the east by the Dão DOC. It is located close to the Atlantic which ocean currents have a moderating effect on the climate, resulting in a mild, maritime climate with abundant rainfall. The region is hilly, but the majority of the vineyards are placed on flatter land. About 2/3 of the national sparkling wine production takes place in this region, and in recent years the city of Anadia received the nickname of "Capital do Espumante", which translates to "Sparkling Wine Capital". The region is also known for its deep colored tannic red wines, that often have bell pepper and black currant flavors, as well its emerging rosé production. The boundaries of the Bairrada DOC includes the municipalities of Anadia, Cantanhede, Mealhada and Oliveira do Bairro.	
Bucelas	Lisboa	Bucelas (historically known as Bucellas) is a Portuguese wine-region located in the Lisboa wine-region which is a registered PDO. The region uses Portugal's highest wine classification as a Denominação de Origem Controlada (DOC). Located south of the Arruda DOC, the region is noted for its potential for cool fermentation white wine production. Vineyards in the area are planted on predominantly loam soils. The white wines of Bucelas became widely popular during the Elizabethan era in England and again during the Victorian age. In London the wines were sometimes described as Portuguese hock because of their similarities to the German Rieslings from the Rhine. Urban sprawl in the 20th century has drastically reduced viticulture in the area, located north of the Portuguese capital city, Lisbon.	Vineyards in Bucelas
Carcavelos	Carcavelos	Carcavelos is a Portuguese wine region centered on the Carcavelos municipality in Estremadura region and includes land near the cities of Cascais and Oeiras. The region has Portugal's highest wine classification as a Denominação de Origem Controlada (DOC). Located at the very southern tip of the Estremadura region, the region has a long winemaking history dating back to the 18th century when Sebastião José de Carvalho e Melo, Marquis of Pombal owned vineyards here. The region is known for its fortified wine production, creating off dry, topaz colored wines that have nutty aromas and flavors. While once a thriving wine region, world-renowned in the 19th century for its tawny colored fortified wine, in the modern era Carcavelos has been devastated by real estate development in the suburbs of the capital city of Lisbon and nearby coastal city of Estoril.	Wine regions of Portugal. Carcavelos is highlighted as region #4.
Carne Cachena da Peneda	Viana do Castelo and Braga	Carne Cachena da Peneda is meat from Cachena: a breed of triple-purpose cattle from Portugal and Galicia, Spain. They are fed through grazing at high altitudes, except in winter, when they are fed closer to small population centres. The production area of the PDO comprises 743 km^{2}.	Cachena bull in Terras de Bouro, Portugal
Carne Marinhoa	Portugal	Carne Marinhoa is meat from the Marinhoa: a cattle breed from Portugal. A large animal with harmonious forms. Thick elastic and prominent skin; light brown coat, tending to straw; docile temperament; long and flat head; bulky but not large abdomen; long wide and deep back and topsides; muscled members, strong, with good angulation; dark mucous; small horns; sub-concave profile. The breed region is circumscribed almost exclusively to the Central Portugal in Aveiro District.	
Carne Maronesa	Serra do Marão	Carne Maronesa is meat from the Maronesa: a traditional Portuguese breed of mountain cattle. Its name derives from that of the Serra do Marão, which lies in the Trás-os-Montes and Douro Litoral regions in the northern part of the country. Its primary use is for draught power.	In the Parque Natural do Alvão
Carne Mertolenga	Portugal	Carne Mertolenga is meat from the Mertolenga: a cattle breed from Portugal, one of thirteen registered Portuguese breeds (as of 2003), making up around 19 per cent of cattle in that country.	Mertolenga
Carne Mirandesa	Portugal	Carne Mirandesa is meat of the Mirandesa, a cattle breed from Portugal.	
Colares	Colares	Colares is a Portuguese wine region centered on the Colares municipality in Estremadura region. The region has Portugal's highest wine classification as a Denominação de Origem Controlada (DOC). Located along the southwestern Atlantic coast, vineyards in the area are protected from the strong ocean winds by sandy dunes. In the 1940s, vineyards covered 2,500 acres but have since been reduced by suburbanization to 50 acres. Between 1934 and 1994, only the local co-op could use the Colares appellation. Because grapevines there are grown directly upon the sand, and phylloxera aphids cannot live on sand, Colares vineyards are some of the only European vines that are not grafted upon American rootstocks. The ungrafted Ramisco vines of the Colares region are some of the oldest in Portugal. The region is known for its deep colored, full bodied red wines that are high in astringent tannins.	
Dão	Região Demarcada	Dão is a Portuguese wine region situated in the Região Demarcada do Dão with the Dão-Lafões sub region of the Centro, Portugal. It is one of the oldest established wine regions in Portugal. Dão wine is produced in a mountainous region with a temperate climate, in the area of the Rio Mondego and Dão rivers in the north central region of Portugal. The region became a Denominação de Origem Controlada (DOC) appellation in 1990. The Dão region is the origin of the Touriga Nacional vine that is the principal component of port wine.	A glass of Dão wine made from Jaen, Touriga Nacional and Tinta Roriz
Douro	Trás-os-Montes e Alto Douro	Douro is a Portuguese wine region centered on the Douro River in the Trás-os-Montes e Alto Douro region. It is sometimes referred to as the Alto Douro (upper Douro), as it is located some distance upstream from Porto, sheltered by mountain ranges from coastal influence. The region has Portugal's highest wine classification as a Denominação de Origem Controlada (DOC). While the region is associated primarily with Port wine production, the Douro produces just as much table wine (non-fortified wines) as it does fortified wine. The non-fortified wines are typically referred to as "Douro wines". Alto Douro was one of the 13 regions of continental Portugal identified by geographer Amorim Girão, in a study published between 1927 and 1930. Together with Trás-os-Montes it became Trás-os-Montes e Alto Douro Province. The style of wines produced in the Douro range from light, Bordeaux-style claret to rich Burgundian-style wines aged in new oak.	Douro DOC wine
Lagoa	Lagoa	Lagoa is a Portuguese wine region centered on the Lagoa municipality in the Algarve region. The region has Portugal's highest wine classification as a Denominação de Origem Controlada (DOC). The region is bordered to the west by the Portimão DOC and to the east by Tavira DOC. The region has been historically known for its fortified wine production but has been expanding its table wine production in recent years.	
Lagos	Lagos	Lagos is a Portuguese wine region centered on the Lagos municipality in the Algarve region. The region has Portugal's highest wine classification as a Denominação de Origem Controlada (DOC). Located on the southwestern corner of Algarve, the region is bordered to the east by the Portimão DOC.	
Pêra Rocha do Oeste	Oeste	Pêra Rocha do Oeste (literally "rock pear of Oeste") is a native Portuguese variety of pear. The earliest account of the Rocha variety dates from 1836, in the Sintra municipality. This variety was casually obtained from a seed, on Pedro António Rocha's farm. The variety derives its name from his family name. The 'Rocha' pear is produced in several places in Portugal. The production area is over 100 km^{2} and there are about 9,450 producers. The PDO status was register in 2003.	Rocha pear
Porto / Port / vinho do Porto / Port Wine / vin de Porto / Oporto / Portvin / Portwein / Portwijn	Porto	Porto / Port / vinho do Porto / Port Wine / vin de Porto / Oporto / Portvin / Portwein / Portwijn is a Portuguese fortified wine produced in the Douro Valley of northern Portugal. It is typically a sweet red wine, often served as a dessert wine, although it also comes in dry, semi-dry, and white varieties. Other port-style fortified wines are produced outside Portugal, in Argentina, Australia, Canada, France, India, South Africa, Spain, and the United States, but as a PDO, only Porto from the Porto region can be referred to as such.	A glass of tawny port
Portimão	Portimão	Portimão is a Portuguese wine region centered on the Portimão municipality in the Algarve region. The region has Portugal's highest wine classification as a Denominação de Origem Controlada (DOC). The region is bordered by the Lagoa DOC to the east and the Lagos DOC to the west.	
Presunto de Barrancos / Paleta de Barrancos	South-west of the Iberian Peninsula	Presunto is a dry-cured ham from Portugal, similar to Italian prosciutto crudo or Spanish jamón. Presunto de Barrancos is the PDO from the Barrancos area in the southwest of Portugal.	
Queijo de Azeitão	Azeitão	Queijo de Azeitão is a Portuguese cheese originating from the town of Azeitão, in the municipality of Setúbal. It is produced in Setúbal, Palmela and Sesimbra. It has been granted PDO status in the European Union. In 2014, Azeitão cheese was named one of the 50 best gastronomic products in the world by the Great Taste Awards.	Queijo de Azeitão
Queijo de Cabra Transmontano / Queijo de Cabra Transmontano Velho	Alto Trás-os-Montes	Queijo de Cabra Transmontano (Transmontano Goat's Cheese) is a type of cheese made from goat milk (goat cheese) from Alto Trás-os-Montes, Norte Region, Portugal. Besides registration as a PDO it is listed on the Ark of Taste.	Queijo de Cabra Transmontano
Queijo de Nisa	Nisa	Queijo de Nisa is a semi-hard sheep's milk cheese from the municipality of Nisa, in the subregion of Alto Alentejo in Portugal. It is created from raw milk, which is coagulated, then curdled using an infusion of thistle. It is yellowish white, with a robust flavor and a somewhat acidic finish. Since 1996, Nisa cheese has a protected geographical status. It was honored by the magazine Wine Spectator as one of the world's top 100 in an edition devoted to cheese: "100 Great Cheeses".	Queijo de nisa
Queijo do Pico	Pico	Cheese of Pico (Portuguese: Queijo do Pico) is a cheese originating from the island of Pico in the Portuguese archipelago of the Azores. It has been classified as a PDO since October 1996.	Queijo do Pico
Queijo S. Jorge	São Jorge	São Jorge Cheese (Portuguese: Queijo São Jorge) is a semi-hard to hard cheese, produced on the island of São Jorge, in the Portuguese archipelago of the Azores, certified as a Região Demarcada do Queijo de São Jorge (Demarcated Region of the Cheese of São Jorge).	Queijo São Jorge inteiro
Queijo Serpa	Serpa	Queijo Serpa is a type of cheese from Serpa, Alentejo, Portugal. It has a Protected designation of origin (PDO) and is listed on the Ark of Taste.	
Queijo Serra da Estrela	Serra da Estrela	Serra da Estrela cheese (Queijo Serra da Estrela) is a cheese made in mountainous region of Serra da Estrela in Portugal. The region where the Serra da Estrela cheese can be manufactured is limited to an area of 3,143.16 km^{2} (1,213.58 sq mi), which comprises the municipalities of Celorico da Beira, Fornos de Algodres, Gouveia, Mangualde, Manteigas, Nelas, Oliveira do Hospital, Penalva do Castelo, Carregal do Sal and Seia.	Queijo Serra da Estrela
Requeijão Serra da Estrela	Serra da Estrela	Requeijão Serra da Estrela is a milk-derived product, produced in Serra da Estrela. It is a loose, ricotta-like cheese used to make cheese spreads. It can be a good substitute to mild, unsalty ricotta. This variety is sometimes sold in the markets wrapped in fresh corn husks. The Portuguese product is white to yellowish-white, solid, and usually having a characteristic strong taste; typically sold in specially designed draining plastic or basket-like weaved containers, or in plastic cups.	
Setúbal	Setúbal Municipality	Setúbal, or Moscatel de Setúbal, is a Portuguese muscatel produced around the Setúbal Municipality on the Península de Setúbal. The region is known primarily for its fortified Muscat wines known as Moscatel de Setúbal. The style was believed to have been invented by José Maria da Fonseca, the founder of José Maria da Fonseca, the oldest table wine company in Portugal dating back to 1834. J.M. Fonseca company still holds a quasi-monopoly control over the production of Moscatel de Setúbal today.	
Tavira	Algarve	Tavira is a Portuguese wine region centered on the Tavira Municipality in the Algarve region. The region has Portugal's highest wine classification as a Denominação de Origem Controlada (DOC). Extending to the Spanish border, the region is flanked on the west by the Lagoa DOC.	
Sal e Flor de Sal de Tavira DOP	Tavira	Sal Artesanal e Flor de Sal Artesanal de Tavira Salt from Tavira, Algarve, Portugal. It has a Protected designation of origin (PDO) since 2013.	

== Romania ==
Product name	Area	Short description	Image
Telemea de Ibăneşti	Ibănești, Mureș	Telemea de Ibăneşti is the name of a Romanian cheese traditionally made of sheep's milk (Telemea), as it is produced in the municipalities Gurghiu, Hodac and Ibănești in Mureș county. Nowadays, the term encompasses cheese made out of cow's milk, and in some cases of goat's, or buffalo's milk. In 2017, the PDO was registered.	Telemea

== Slovakia ==
Product name	Area	Short description	Image
Paprika Žitava / Žitavská paprika	Podunajská nížina	Paprika Žitava or Žitavská paprika indicating a specific production of red paprika made by grinding dried spice pepper fruits that are harvested in the area of Podunajská nížina (in the Danubian Lowland). This was the first food product to earn a PDO designation from the Slovak Republic, in 2014.	

== South Africa ==
Product name	Area	Short description	Image
Rooibos / Red Bush	Western Cape and Northern Cape	Rooibos / Red Bush, meaning "red bush"; is tea made from the eponymous broom-like member of the plant family Fabaceae that grows in South Africa's fynbos. It contains between 0,02 and 1,16 % of aspalathin and up to 0,4 % nothofagin.	Rooibos

== Spain ==
Product name	Area	Short description	Image
Arzúa-Ulloa	Galicia	Arzúa-Ulloa cheese is a cow's milk cheese made in the Spanish autonomic region of Galicia, in Arzúa-A Ulloa. It is a soft cheese, made from raw or pasteurized milk, has a minimum maturity period of six days, and has a lenticular shape, or cylindrical with rounded edges. Its rind is thin and pliant, medium to dark yellow, bright, clean and smooth. The cheese itself is uniform in color between white and pale yellow. It is soft and creamy without cracks but may have a few small holes or bubbles. The flavour is slightly sweet and grassy. It is similar in flavor to its cousin cheese, Tetilla. Unlike Tetilla cheese, Arzúa-Ulloa has a soft pliant rind, and has a disc shape. In addition to the PDO status, there are two other labels that the cheese may carry, farm-made Arzúa-Ulloa (Arzúa-Ulloa de Granxa), a cheese having the particularity that the milk comes entirely from cows on the same farm (its characteristics being otherwise similar), and aged Arzúa-Ulloa (Arzúa-Ulloa curado), a cheese that has been aged for at least six months, with the result that it is firmer in texture throughout.	Queixos Arzúa-Ulloa
Cabrales	Asturias	Cabrales is a blue cheese made in the artisan tradition by rural dairy farmers in Asturias, Spain. This cheese can be made from pure, unpasteurized cow's milk or blended in the traditional manner with goat or sheep milk, which lends the cheese a stronger, spicier flavor. All of the milk used in the production of Cabrales must come exclusively from herds raised in a small zone of production in Asturias, in the mountains of the Picos de Europa. Traditionally, Cabrales was sold wrapped in the moist leaves of Acer pseudoplatanus (Sycamore Maple), but nowadays regulations require that commercially produced Cabrales be sold in a dark-green-colored aluminum foil with the registered official stamp of the PDO Queso de Cabrales. Within the production zone it is still possible to encounter Cabrales cheese with the traditional maple leaf wrapping, although it is only ever produced in small batches and not approved for export, as it is ineligible for DO status. The same is true of other Spanish blue cheeses, also traditionally leaf-wrapped, such as Valdeón and Picón Bejes-Tresviso.	Cabrales
Gamoneu / Gamonedo	Principality of Asturias	Gamoneu / Gamonedo is a fatty Spanish cheese made in certain parts of the Principality of Asturias. Taking its name from the village of Gamonéu where it was originally made, Gamonéu cheese has a Protected Designation of Origin. It is a lightly smoked cheese with a thin, natural rind that is coloured brownish with some red, green and blue patches. Moulds on the rind slightly invade the interior of the cheese. Gamonéu cheese is sold in the form of cylinders with flat ends in weights varying between 500g (18 oz) to 7 kg (15 lbs).	Gamonedo
Idiazabal	Basque Country	Idiazabal is a pressed cheese made from unpasteurized sheep milk, usually from Latxa and Carranzana sheep in the Basque Country and Navarre. It has a somewhat smokey flavor, but is usually un-smoked. The cheese is handmade and covered in a hard, dark brown, inedible rind. It is aged for a few months, specifically no less than 60 days, and develops a nutty, buttery flavor, eaten fresh, often with quince jam. If aged longer, it becomes firm, dry and sharp and can be used for grating. The Denomination of Origin for Idiazabal cheese was created in 1987 and defines the basic regulations for the product's manufacture. Typically, unpasteurized milk from latxa breed of sheep is used, although in some cases the D.O. permits the use of milk from Carranzana breed, from the Encartaciones in Biscay. The D.O. also stipulates that the milk be curdled with the natural lamb rennet, and permits external smoking of the cheese. The cheeses produced in the following towns in accordance with all the D.O. regulations, are therefore also protected by the Idiazabal D.O. : Urbia, Entzia, Gorbea, Orduña, Urbasa and Aralar. Recently some Basque Country farmers have begun to use hybrid Assaf sheep, which some maintain does not meet the Denomination of Origin for the cheese.	Idiazabal
Jamón de Teruel / Paleta de Teruel	Teruel	Jamón de Teruel / Paleta de Teruel is a meat product from the Teruel region, which has PDO registration since 1996.	Despaña jamon carving
Mahón-Menorca	Mahón	Mahón-Menorca (formatge de Maó in the original Catalan, queso de Mahón in Spanish) is a soft to hard white cheese made from cows' milk, named after the town and natural port of Mahón, on the island of Menorca off the Mediterranean coast of Spain. Menorca is known for its cheese production and is home to one of the most respected dairy plants in Europe.	Mahón cheese
Queso Palmero / Queso de la Palma	La Palma	Queso Palmero / Queso de la Palma is a Spanish plain or lightly smoked cheese from the island of La Palma in the Canary Islands. It is made of unpasteurised goats milk and has Denomination of Origin protection. The goats are free to graze on natural wild plants which are available all year round. The cheese is made on many small farms all over the island. It is presented in cylindrical cheeses of up to 15 kilos (33 lbs).	Queso Palmero
Picón Bejes-Tresviso	Cantabria	Picón Bejes-Tresviso is a blue cheese from Cantabria, in the north of Spain. It has been protected under Denominación de Origen (DO) legislation since 1994, prior to which it was traditionally known as Picón de Tresviso and Queso Picón de Bejes. The designated area centers in the Liébana valley and production is restricted to the municipalities of Potes, Pesaguero, Cabezón de Liébana, Camaleño, Cillorigo de Liébana, Peñarrubia, Tresviso and Vega de Liébana.Although much of the process thus far may take place in modern industrial units, DO regulations stipulate that final maturity be achieved by further curing in a natural limestone cave, typical of the geology of the Liébana region, for a minimum of two months. Maturation in this cool, high-humidity environment develops the particular taste and Brevibacterium-infested crust typical of many blue cheeses. Since Brevibacterium contributes to human foot odour, it adds to the cheese's characteristic and complex aroma.	Picón Bejes-Tresviso cheese
Queso Casín	Principality of Asturias	Queso Casín is a Spanish cheese made in the Principality of Asturias. It is made from full-fat, unpasteurized cows' milk from specific breeds, namely Asturian Mountain (Asturiana de la Montaña, a.k.a. Casina), Asturian Valley (Asturiana de la Valles), Friesian and any crosses between these breeds. Specifically the geographic area of manufacture is the southern part of Asturias which includes the Redes Natural Park (Parque Natural de Redes) and associated land, this is within the municipalities of Caso, Sobrescobio and Piloña. The cheese is classified as hard and semi-hard, and can be semi-cured or cured. It takes its name from one of the breeds of cattle whose milk is used, in turn named after the town of Caso. The shape of the cheese is a thick disc-shape, sometime more conical, of 10–20 cm diameter and 4–7 cm in height. The weight is between 250 and 1,000 g (8.8 and 35.3 oz).	Queso casín
Queso de Flor de Guía / Queso de Media Flor de Guía / Queso de Guía	Gran Canaria	Queso de Flor de Guía / Queso de Media Flor de Guía / Queso de Guía is a Spanish cheese (Spanish: Queso de Flor de guía) made on the island of Gran Canaria in the Canary Islands. The cheese is classified as fatty or semi-fatty and made from the milk from Canarian sheep, with milk from Canarian cows or goats. The milk from the sheep must constitute at least 60% and cows' milk content must never exceed 40%. Goat milk must never exceed 10% of the mixture. The cheese is presented in flat cylindrical cheeses which normally measure 4–8 cm (1.5-3 inches) high and 20–30 cm (8–12 inches) across and weighing between 2 and 5 kg (4.5–11 pounds). The cheese gets its name from an area in northern Gran Canaria called Santa María de Guía, where the cheese is made, and ‘flor' from the fact that juice from the flowerheads of a species of cardoon and globe artichoke are used to curdle the milk. The cows are kept stabled for most of the year but when conditions are favourable they are tethered in open pasture. The goats are grazed on fenced land within the specified area and gathered in at night. The animals may be milked mechanically or manually. The former are conditions of the Spanish Denomination of Origin.	Queso de flor
Queso Majorero	Fuerteventura	Queso Majorero is a goat milk cheese from Spain. Similar to Manchego, this firm cheese has a milky, nutty flavour that goes well with various pear products. It is pale white in colour, and comes in large wheels. Currently it is protected under European Law with Protected Designation of Origin (PDO) status. Majorero comes from the island of Fuerteventura in the Canary Islands. The word Mahorero (Majorero) is a Guanche word still used today to describe the people of Fuerteventura. This island has a rich farming tradition, and goats were very important to their economy. It is from the Majorera goat that this particular cheese is made. The goat produces a thick, aromatic and high-fat milk.	Grilled majorero cheese
Queso Nata de Cantabria	Cantabria	Queso de nata de Cantabria (English: Cantabrian cream cheese) is made from the milk of Friesian cows in Cantabria, an autonomous community in northern Spain. The cheese is registered as a PDO since 1985. The production of the cheese is confined to all parts of Cantabria, except the areas of Tresviso and Menor de Bejes in the western part of the region. It is presented in forms of various weights from 400 – 2,800 g (14 ounces – 6 lbs). The size of the forms varies according to the weight.	
Roncal	Valle de Roncal	Roncal (Erronkariko gazta in Basque) is a hard, creamy sheep milk cheese. It is made in one of seven villages in the Valle de Roncal of Spain. Roncal enjoys PDO status.	Queso roncal
Queso Tetilla / Queixo Tetilla	Galicia	Queso Tetilla / Queixo Tetilla is a regional cow's-milk cheese made in Galicia, in north-western Spain. It is a common element in Galician cuisine, often used as a dessert. It has had Denominación de Origen certification since 1993 and PDO registration since 1996. It was originally produced in small towns such as Arzúa, Melide, Curtis or Sobrado dos Monxes, near the border between the provinces of A Coruña and Pontevedra; it is now produced throughout Galicia. It is made with milk from three breeds of cattle: imported Friesian and Parda Alpina (Braunvieh), and the local Rubia Gallega of Galicia. The name tetilla (Spanish for small breast; the word is also the official name in Galician) describes the shape of the cheese, a sort of cone topped by a nipple, or a half pear – hence its other name, perilla. It weighs from 0.5 to 1.5 kg, with a diameter and height ranging from 90 to 150 mm.	Queso tetilla entre otros
Tierra del Vino de Zamora	Zamora	Tierra del Vino (literally, "the Land of Wine") is a Denominación de Origen of wine, designating wines from the provinces of Zamora and Salamanca. "Tierra del Vino" has held a Denomination of Origin since 28 April 2007, when Order AYG/782/07, dated 24, came into effect. The region known as Tierra del Vino lies on both banks of the Duero River as it winds its way through the province of Zamora, and is crossed from North to South by the Roman Silver Road, the Vía de la Plata. It covers a total surface area of 1,799 square kilometres, which extend throughout a total of 56 boroughs; 46 in the province of Zamora and a further ten in the province of Salamanca.	

== Sweden ==
Product name	Area	Short description	Image
Kalix Löjrom	Bothnian Bay	Kalix Löjrom is the designation of the roe of the small salmonid fish species vendace (Coregonus albula), harvested specifically from the Bothnian Bay archipelago of the Baltic Sea in northern Sweden. Since 2010 it has a status of Protected Designation of Origin (PDO) issued by the European Union, and is the only Swedish product with the PDO status. Kalix is a locality in Norrbotten County. The roe harvest normally starts late September and continues until the vendace are ready for spawning around late October. For various reasons the roe has a more orange or red color than most vendace roe and the grains have a mild taste. Kalix Löjrom is often served at royal dinners and it is common on the Nobel prize banquets. Kalix Löjrom means literally "Kalix vendace roe". It is marketed as "Caviar of Kalix".	Kalix Löjrom

== Turkey ==
Product name	Area	Short description	Image
Taşköprü Sarımsağı	Taşköprü Sarımsağı	Taşköprü Sarımsağı is garlic from the variety Allium sativum var. sativum. possessing a bitter taste and strong smell. The geographical area of production comprises 1 811,31 km2 and is known for its garlic production.	
Bingöl Balı	Bingöl highlands	This honey, unique to the province of Bingöl, is a delectable product that ranges in colour from light amber to dark amber. Around 1,700 plant species exist in the area, 300 of which are endemic to the highlands Bingöl. The region’s rich floral diversity, climatic characteristics, and wide range of flowering periods contribute to the honey’s remarkable flavour. Beekeeping, a longstanding tradition in Bingöl, is an essential source of income for the region.	

== United Kingdom ==
Product name	Area	Short description	Image
Bonchester cheese	Bonchester Bridge	Bonchester cheese is a soft Scottish cheese made from unpasteurized Jersey cows' milk. It is produced in Bonchester Bridge, Roxburghshire.	
Buxton Blue	Buxton	Buxton Blue is an English blue cheese that is a close relative of Blue Stilton, is made from cow's milk, and is lightly veined with a deep russet colouring. It is usually made in a cylindrical shape.	
West Country farmhouse Cheddar cheese	Cheddar, Somerset	West Country farmhouse Cheddar cheese, commonly known as cheddar, is a relatively hard, off-white (or orange if colourings such as annatto are added), sometimes sharp-tasting, natural cheese. Cheddar originates in the English village of Cheddar in Somerset.	Somerset-Cheddar
Cornish Clotted Cream	Cornwall	Cornish Clotted cream (Cornish: dehen molys, sometimes called scalded, clouted, Devonshire or Cornish cream) is a thick cream made by indirectly heating full-cream cow's milk using steam or a water bath and then leaving it in shallow pans to cool slowly. During this time, the cream content rises to the surface and forms "clots" or "clouts", hence the name. It forms an essential part of a cream tea.	Clotted cream (cropped)
Dovedale cheese	Dovedale	Dovedale, sold as 'Dovedale Blue', is a blue cheese. It is named after the Dovedale valley in the Peak District, near where it is produced. Dovedale is a soft, creamy cheese with a mild blue flavour. It is made from full fat cow's milk. Unusually for a British cheese, it is brine dipped, rather than dry-salted, giving it a distinctive continental appearance and flavour. In 2007, Dovedale was awarded Protected designation of origin (PDO) status, meaning that it must be traditionally manufactured within 50 miles (80 km) of the Dovedale valley. The original cheese was invented and is still produced at the Hartington Creamery in Derbyshire; a version is also produced by the Staffordshire Cheese Company in Cheddleton, Staffordshire.	Dovedale cheese
Single Gloucester	Gloucester	Gloucester is a traditional, semi-hard cheese which has been made in Gloucestershire, England, since the 16th century.	
Halen Môn	Anglesey	Sea salt produced from the waters of the Menai Strait.	
Lakeland Herdwick	Lake District	The Herdwick is a breed of domestic sheep native to the Lake District in North West England. The name "Herdwick" is derived from the Old Norse herdvyck, meaning sheep pasture. Though low in lambing capacity and perceived wool quality when compared to more common commercial breeds, Herdwicks are prized for their robust health, their ability to live solely on forage, and their tendency to be territorial and not to stray over the difficult upland terrain of the Lake District. It is considered that up to 99% of all Herdwick sheep are commercially farmed in the central and western Lake District. In 2013, Lakeland Herdwick meat received a Protected Designation of Origin from the European Union.	A Herdwick ewe
Jersey Royal potatoes	Jersey	The Jersey Royal is the marketing name of a type of potato grown in Jersey which has a Protected Designation of Origin (PDO). The potatoes are of the variety known as International Kidney and are typically grown as a new potato. Under the Common Agricultural Policy of the European Union Jersey Royals are covered by a PDO.	'Jersey Royals', boiled
Orkney lamb	North Ronaldsay	The North Ronaldsay or Orkney is a breed of sheep from North Ronaldsay, the northernmost island of Orkney, off the north coast of Scotland. It belongs to the Northern European short-tailed sheep group of breeds, and has evolved without much cross-breeding with modern breeds. It is a smaller sheep than most, with the rams (males) horned and ewes (females) mostly hornless. It was formerly kept primarily for wool, but now the two largest flocks are feral, one on North Ronaldsay and another on the Orkney island of Auskerry. The Rare Breeds Survival Trust lists the breed as a priority on their 2021–2022 watchlist, and they are in danger of dying out with fewer than 600 registered breeding females in the United Kingdom. The semi-feral flock on North Ronaldsay is the original flock that evolved to subsist almost entirely on seaweed – they are one of few mammals to do this. They are confined to the foreshore by a 1.8 m (6 ft) drystane dyke, which completely encircles the island, forcing the sheep to evolve this unusual characteristic. The wall was built as kelping (the production of soda ash from seaweed) on the shore became uneconomical. Sheep were confined to the shore to protect the fields and crofts inside, and afterwards subsisted largely on seaweed. This diet has caused a variety of adaptations in the sheep's digestive system. These sheep have to extract the trace element copper far more efficiently than other breeds as their diet has a limited supply of copper. This results in them being susceptible to copper toxicity, if fed on a grass diet, as copper is toxic to sheep in high quantities. Grazing habits have also changed to suit the sheep's environment. To reduce the chance of being stranded by an incoming tide, they graze at low tide and then ruminate at high tide. A range of fleece colours are exhibited, including grey, brown and red. Meat from the North Ronaldsay has a distinctive flavour, described as "intense" and "gamey", due, in part, to the high iodine content in their diet of seaweed. The meat has Protected Geographical Status in European Union law, so only meat from North Ronaldsay sheep can be marketed as Orkney Lamb.Lamb meat and mutton from the sheep have been specially designated by the European Union, meaning that only pure-bred lambs can be marketed as "Orkney Lamb". The meat has a unique, rich flavour, which has been described as "intense and almost gamey", and has a darker colour than most mutton, due in part to the animals' iodine-rich diet.	A North Ronaldsay sheep with twin lambs on the beach, with seals in the background
Yorkshire Forced Rhubarb	West Yorkshire	The Rhubarb Triangle (or Tusky Triangle, from a Yorkshire word for rhubarb) is a 9-square-mile (23 km^{2}) area of West Yorkshire, England between Wakefield, Morley and Rothwell famous for producing early forced rhubarb. It includes Kirkhamgate, East Ardsley, Stanley, Lofthouse and Carlton. The Rhubarb Triangle was originally much bigger, covering an area between Leeds, Bradford and Wakefield. From the 1900s to 1930s, the rhubarb industry expanded and at its peak covered an area of about 30 square miles (78 km^{2}). Twelve farmers who farm within the Rhubarb Triangle applied to have the name "Yorkshire forced rhubarb" added to the list of foods and drinks that have their names legally protected by the European Commission's Protected Food Name scheme. The application was successful and the farmers in the Rhubarb Triangle (Note: The Rhubarb Triangle's geographical area in EU law is " from Ackworth Moor Top north along the A628 to Featherstone and Pontefract. Then on to the A656 through Castleford. It then goes west along the A63 past Garforth and West Garforth. Head north passing Whitkirk, Manston and on towards the A6120 by Scholes. Follow the A6120 west, round to pass Farsley which then leads south west via the A647 onto the A6177. Pass Dudley Hill to pick up the M606 south. At junction 26 take the M62 south to junction 25 head east along A644 toward Dewsbury, passing Mirfield, to pick up the A638 towards Wakefield. At Wakefield take the A638 south to Ackworth Moor top.) were awarded Protected Designation of Origin status (PDO) in February 2010. Leeds Central MP Hilary Benn was involved in the Defra campaign to win protected status.	Rhubarb sculpture
Shetland Lamb	Shetland Isles	The Shetland is a small, wool-producing breed of sheep originating in the Shetland Isles, Scotland, but is now also kept in many other parts of the world. It is part of the Northern European short-tailed sheep group, and it is closely related to the extinct Scottish Dunface. Shetlands are classified as a landrace or "unimproved" breed. This breed is kept for its very fine wool, for meat, and for conservation grazing.	Shetland ewe grazing on heathland: this "badger-faced" pattern is called katmoget.
White Stilton cheese / Blue Stilton cheese	Derbyshire, Nottinghamshire, Leicestershire	Stilton is an English cheese, produced in two varieties: Blue, which has had Penicillium roqueforti added to generate a characteristic smell and taste, and White, which has not. Both have been granted the status of a protected designation of origin (PDO) by the European Commission, requiring that only such cheese produced in the three counties of Derbyshire, Leicestershire and Nottinghamshire may be called "Stilton". The cheese takes its name from the village of Stilton, now in Cambridgeshire, where it has long been sold. Stilton cheese cannot be produced in Stilton village, which gave the cheese its name, because it is not in any of the three permitted counties, but in the administrative county of Cambridgeshire and the historic county of Huntingdonshire.	Blue Stilton

== United States ==
Product name	Area	Short description	Image
Napa Valley	Napa County, California	Napa Valley is an American Viticultural Area (AVA) located in Napa County in California's Wine Country. Records of commercial wine production in the region date back to the nineteenth century, but premium wine production dates back only to the 1960s.	Napa Valley Wine

== Vietnam ==
Product name	Area	Short description	Image
Phú Quốc	Phú Quốc	Phú Quốc is a fish sauce (or fish extract) originating from Phú Quốc. The extract is produced through lysis, hydrolysis and self-fermentation of fish flesh by enzymes, most of which are contained in the internal organs of fish, and lengthy fermentation of the Clostridium bacterium in a fastidious condition at high temperature. The sauce is made up of locally caught fish, over 85% of which must be anchovies. Salt, and sometimes sugar, is added in the process.	

== See also ==
- List of TSG products by country
