= Algarve VR =

Portuguese wine region

Algarve

Algarve is a Portuguese wine region covering the same areas as its namesake region. The region is classified as a Vinho Regional (VR), a designation similar to a French vin de pays region. Located on the southern coast of Portugal, the region's wine industry is driven by the local tourist economy with very few wines being exported.

== Wine regions ==
Within the Algarve region there are 4 major wine regions. Listed from west to east, these are:

- Lagos DOC
- Portimão DOC
- Lagoa DOC
- Tavira DOC

== Grapes ==
The principle grapes of the Algarve region includes Arinto, Baga, Castelao Nacional, Fernao Pires, Periquita, Rabo de Ovelha, Tinta Amarela, Trincadeira das Pratas, Ugni blanc and Vital.

== See also ==
- List of Portuguese wine regions
