= Tomberry =

Small tomato cultivar

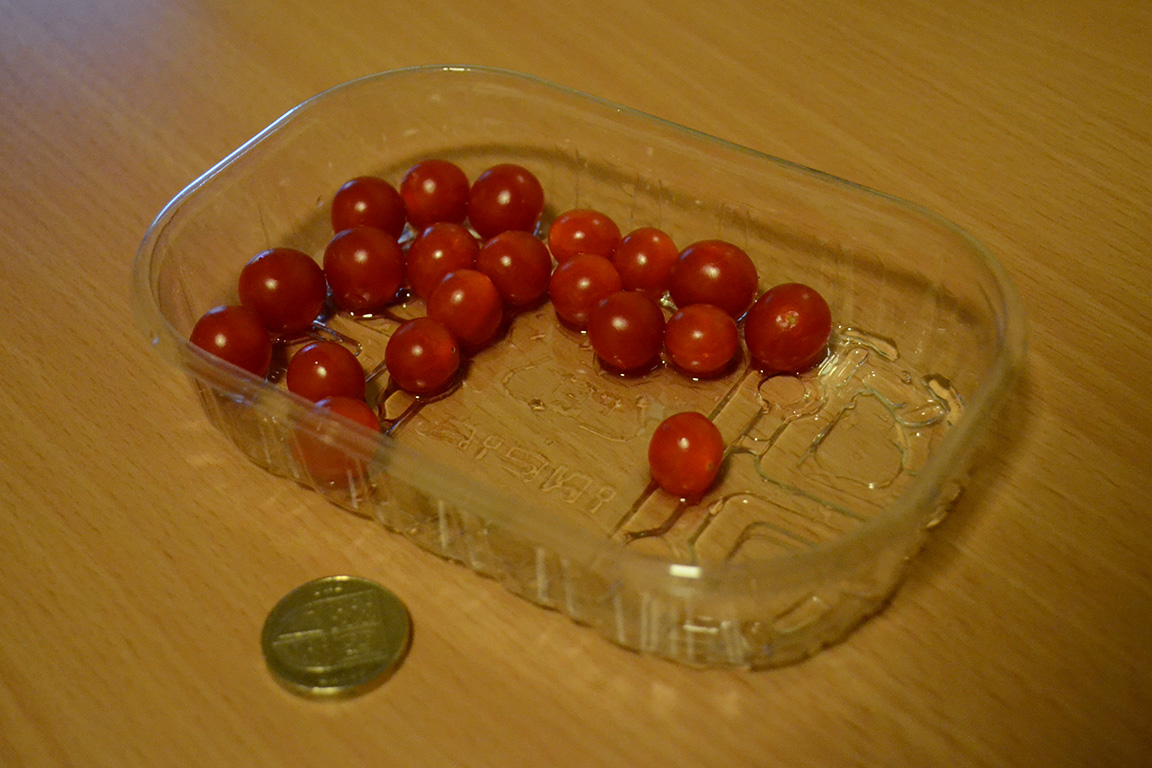
- Tomberries next to a British pound coin

Tomato (Solanum lycopersicum)
- Fruit weight: 1 to 2 grams
- Color: Yellow or red
- Shape: Grape

Tomberry is a trademarked name for an unusually small cultivar of tomatoes developed by the Dutch company Eminent Seeds and produced by the Netherlands company Littletom BV and distributed in the United Kingdom and continental Europe. The Tomberry is about 0.5 to 1 cm in diameter with an average fruit weight of 1 to 2 grams. The fruits grows on branches containing 300 tomatoes. As of 2021 they were sold in Poland, Turkey, Spain, Canada, Mexico and Israel.

== Production ==
The Tomberry presents difficulties for growers. Getting flowers and fruit to set early in growing, and managing new shoots during maturation is difficult. In countries with bumblebees, the insects are released in high amounts into the greenhouse in which they are grown. In countries without bumblebees, such as Australia, pollination is partly automated.

Due to the high amount of fruits to be picked in harvesting, hand-picking is too labour-intensive. As a consequence, growers cut off whole branches and then dry them until they can be shaken loose with a machine. This process is itself precarious.

== See also ==
- List of tomato cultivars
