= Pomodorino del Piennolo del Vesuvio =

Grape tomato grown in Naples, Italy

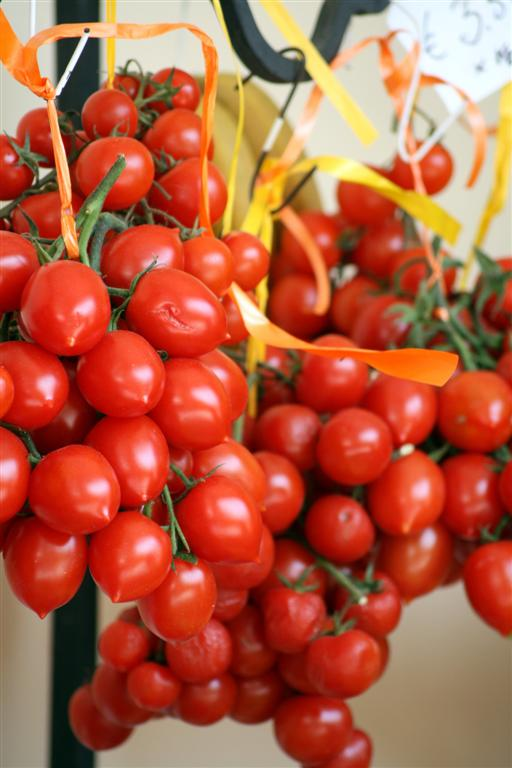
A batch of the pomodorini

Pomodorino del Piennolo del Vesuvio, or sometimes just pomodorino vesuviano, is a grape tomato grown in Naples, Italy. It has protected designation of origin (PDO) status, which was granted in 2009.

The cultivation area is restricted to 18 comuni (municipalities) around Mount Vesuvius, within the Vesuvius National Park.

The cultivar's thick skin and low water content allow their hanging harvested clusters to keep for months in dry conditions, even through winter to spring, from whence the nickname winter tomatoes.

== See also ==
- List of tomato cultivars
