= Silter =

Italian cheese

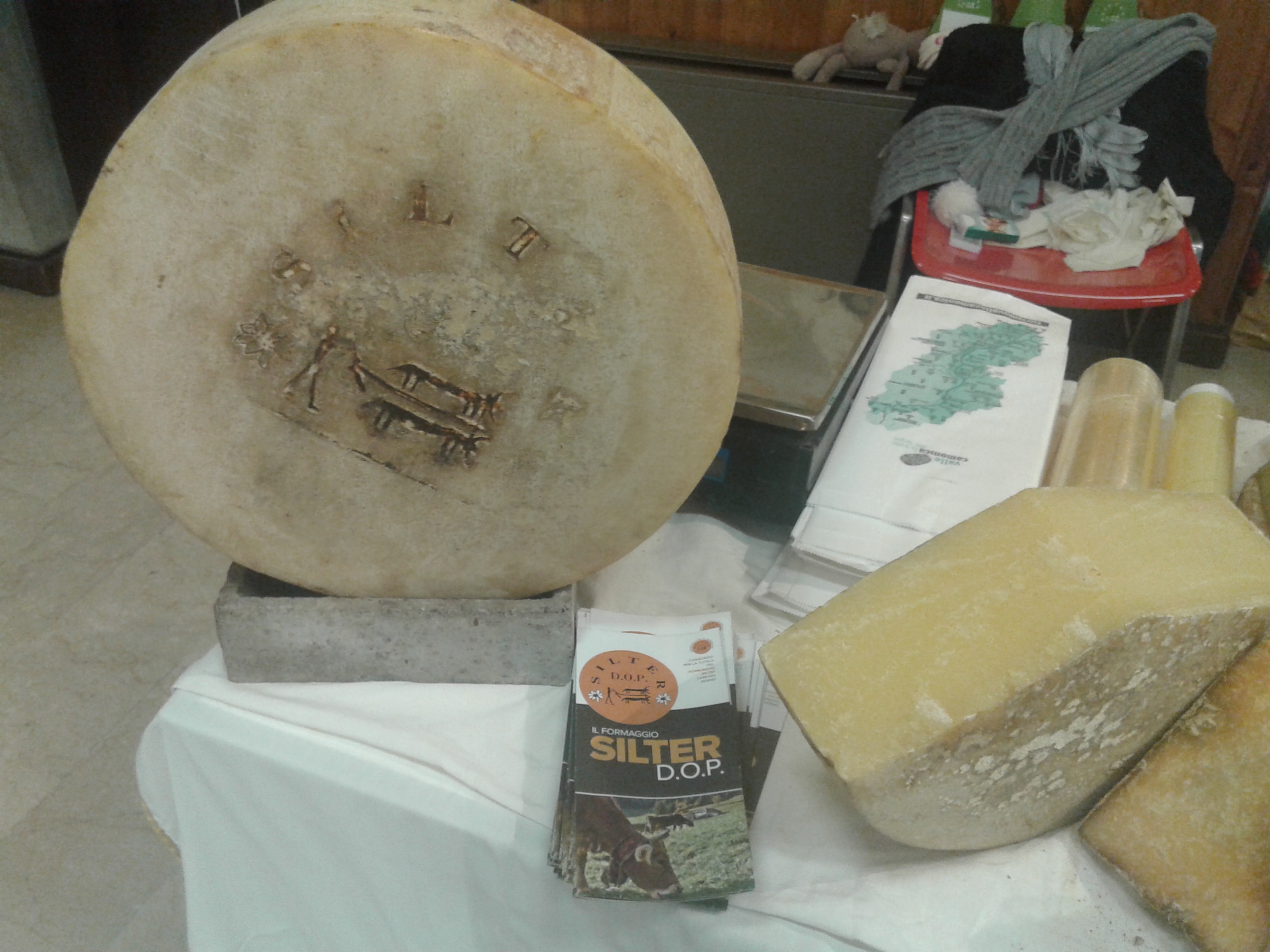

Silter is an Italian hard cheese made within the Lombardy region, around province of Brescia and surrounding areas, and traditionally produced with unpasteurised cows milk during summer months and September, is brined, and aged for a minimum of 6 months.

As of 2015, within the EU, it has PDO certification.

== Name ==
The name Silter originates from the name of the cheese store-room in Val Camonica where cheeses are stored and aged.

== History ==
It is a traditional cheese from Valle Camonica, derived from the milk of brown breed cows, very common in the mountainous areas of the Brescia valleys. It takes its name from the Lombard term, of Celtic origin, which designates the aging room in the malga.

== Production ==
The cheese is produced in the municipalities falling within the Montane Communities of Valle Camonica and partially in the Sebino Bresciano area. Particularly valuable are the shapes made in the malghe located on the Guglielmo and Maniva mountains, in the area of the Croce Domini Pass as well as the Valleys of Case di Viso and Santa Apollonia in Ponte di Legno.

Optimal conservation takes place in not too hot environments which can vary from a temperature between 9 and 14 °C. The minimum seasoning is 100 days.

== See also ==
- List of Italian cheeses
