= Paprika Žitava =

Paprika Žitava or Žitavská paprika is a protected designation of origin, indicating a specific production of red paprika made by grinding dried spice pepper fruits that are harvested in the area of Podunajská nížina (in the Danubian Lowland). This was the first food product to earn a PDO designation from the Slovak Republic, in 2014.

== Characteristics ==
The spice is a sweet paprika, make by grinding the dried pepper fruits. These are picked intact when ripe and undergo a special post-harvest treatment process. The characteristic intense reddish-orange colour is imparted to the paprika during the final grinding stage; a special “colouring stone” applies pressure to the mixture, causing a rise in temperature. The oil contained in the seeds is released, resulting in the change in colour.

The pigments and sugars found in the paprika give it the taste and the intense red colour, both characteristic of the PDO.

== Geographical delimitation ==
The paprika's name is derived from the Žitava river valley, where the peppers were first grown. Their growing area has since spread across the Danubian Lowland, but the name remains.

== History ==
There is a 100-year-old tradition of growing and processing Capsicum peppers in the Danubian Lowland. Paprika Žitava is representative of this tradition.

As of 2020, this paprika is one of the five types that have been granted a Protected Designation of Origin designation in Europe.
