= Miel luxembourgeois de marque nationale =

Honey from Luxembourg that is protected under EU law with PDO status

- Type: Honey

Miel luxembourgeois de marque nationale is a honey from Luxembourg that is protected under EU law with PDO status.

Some of the criteria for the production of this honey include that it:

- must be of high quality
- may not contain any imported honey
- may not contain any additives
- must have a water content of less than 20%
