= Tierra del Vino de Zamora DO =

Coordinates: 41°29′56″N 5°45′20″W

Tierra del Vino de Zamora DOP
- Wine region
- Tierra del Vino de Zamora DOP in the province of Zamora in the region of Castile and León
- Official name: C.R.D.O. Tierra del Vino de Zamora
- Type: Denominación de Origen Protegida (DOP)
- Year established: 2007
- Country: Spain
- Size of planted vineyards: 645 hectares (1,594 acres)
- No. of wineries: 9
- Wine produced: 803 hectolitres
- Comments: Data for 2016 / 2017

Tierra del Vino de Zamora is a Spanish Denominación de Origen Protegida (DOP) for wines located in the province of Zamora, Castile and León, Spain. It was officially upgraded from the lower status of QWPSR (VCPRD in Spanish) 2007.

The authorized white varieties are Malvasía, Moscatel de grano menudo, Verdejo, Albillo, Palomino and Godello while the authorized red varieties are Tempranillo, Garnacha and Cabernet Sauvignon.
