= Lagoa DOC =

Coordinates: 37.1326054°N 8.450888°W

Lagoa is a Portuguese wine region centered on the Lagoa municipality in the Algarve region. The region has Portugal's highest wine classification as a Denominação de Origem Controlada (DOC). The region is bordered to the west by the Portimão DOC and to the east by Tavira DOC. The region has been historically known for its fortified wine production but has been expanding its table wine production in recent years.

== Grapes ==
The principal grapes of the Lagoa region include Crato Branco, Negra Mole and Periquita.

== See also ==
- List of Portuguese wine regions
