= Portimão DOC =

Portuguese wine region

Portimão is a Portuguese wine region centered on the Portimão municipality in the Algarve region. The region has Portugal's highest wine classification as a Denominação de Origem Controlada (DOC). The region is bordered by the Lagoa DOC to the east and the Lagos DOC to the west.

== Grapes ==
The principal grapes of the Portimão region include Crato Branco, Negra Mole and Periquita.

== See also ==
- List of Portuguese wine regions
