= Tavira DOC =

Wine region in Portugal

Tavira is a Portuguese wine region centered on the Tavira Municipality in the Algarve region. The region has Portugal's highest wine classification as a Denominação de Origem Controlada (DOC). Extending to the Spanish border, the region is flanked on the west by the Lagoa DOC.

== Grapes ==
The principal grape varietals of the Tavira region include Crato Branco, Negra Mole and Periquita.

== See also ==
- List of Portuguese wine regions
