= List of European cheeses with protected geographical status =

A number of European cheeses have been granted Protected Geographical Status under European Union and UK law through the Protected Designation of Origin (PDO), Protected Geographical Indication (PGI) or Traditional Speciality Guaranteed (TSG) regimes. The legislation is designed to protect regional foods and came into force in 1992 and applies in the EU and in Northern Ireland. The EU designations are open for EU and non-EU products. Following Brexit therefore, UK cheeses remained in the register. Any cheese with a protected geographical cheese in the EU in 2020, is automatically protected in the UK as well.

The DOOR database includes product names registered cheese names for which registration has been applied. Registered cheeses by country are as follows:

== Austria ==
Designation	Type	Registration year
Gailtaler Almkäse	PDO	1997
Tiroler Almkäse; Tiroler Alpkäse	PDO	1997
Tiroler Bergkäse	PDO	1997
Tiroler Graukäse	PDO	1996
Vorarlberger Alpkäse	PDO	1997
Vorarlberger Bergkäse	PDO	1997

== Belgium ==
Designation	Type	Registration year
Fromage de Herve	PDO	1996

== Bulgaria ==
Designation	Type	Registration year
Българско бяло саламурено сирене / Bulgarsko byalo salamureno sirene	PDO	2023

== Cyprus ==
Designation	Type	Registration year
Χαλλούμι/Halloumi/Hellim	PDO	2021

== Czech Republic ==
Designation	Type	Registration year
Jihočeská Niva	PGI	2010
Jihočeská Zlatá Niva	PGI	2010
Olomoucké tvarůžky	PGI	2010

== Denmark ==
Designation	Type	Registration year
Danbo	PGI	2017
Havarti	PGI	2019
Danablu	PGI	2003
Esrom	PGI	1996

== France ==
Designation	Type	Registration year
Abondance	PDO	1996
Banon	PDO	2007
Beaufort	PDO	2003
Bleu d'Auvergne	PDO	1996
Bleu de Gex Haut-Jura; Bleu de Septmoncel	PDO	1996
Bleu des Causses	PDO	1996
Bleu du Vercors-Sassenage	PDO	2001
Brie de Meaux	PDO	1996
Brie de Melun	PDO	1996
Brillat-Savarin	PGI	2017
Brocciu Corse; Brocciu	PDO	2003
Brousse du Rove	PDO	2020
Camembert de Normandie	PDO	1996
Cantal; Fourme de Cantal; Cantalet	PDO	1996
Chabichou du Poitou	PDO	1996
Chaource	PDO	1996
Chevrotin	PDO	2005
Charolais	PDO	2014
Comté	PDO	1996
Crottin de Chavignol / Chavignol	PDO	1996
Emmental de Savoie	PGI	1996
Emmental français est-central	PGI	1996
Époisses	PDO	1996
French Gruyère	PGI	2013
Fourme d'Ambert	PDO	1996
Fourme de Montbrison	PDO	2010
Laguiole	PDO	2008
Langres	PDO	1996
Livarot	PDO	1996
Mâconnais	PDO	2010
Maroilles / Marolles	PDO	1996
Mont d'Or; Vacherin du Haut-Doubs	PDO	1996
Morbier	PDO	2009
Munster; Munster-Géromé	PDO	1996
Neufchâtel	PDO	1996
Ossau-Iraty	PDO	2003
Pélardon	PDO	2001
Picodon	PDO	2009
Pont-l'Évêque	PDO	1996
Pouligny-Saint-Pierre	PDO	2009
Raclette de Savoie	PGI	2017
Reblochon; Reblochon de Savoie	PDO	1996
Rigotte de Condrieu	PDO	2013
Rocamadour	PDO	2008
Roquefort	PDO	2008
Sainte-Maure de Touraine	PDO	2003
Saint-Marcellin	PGI	2013
Saint-Nectaire	PDO	1996
Salers	PDO	2003
Selles-sur-Cher	PDO	1996
Soumaintrain	PGI	2016
Tome des Bauges	PDO	2007
Tomme de Savoie	PGI	1996
Tomme des Pyrénées	PGI	1996
Tomme fraîche de l'Aubrac	PGI	2023
Valençay	PDO	2004

== Germany ==
Designation	Type	Registration year
Allgäuer Bergkäse	PDO	1997
Allgäuer Emmentaler	PDO	1997
Altenburger Ziegenkäse	PDO	1997
Hessischer Handkäse / Hessischer Handkäs	PGI	2010
Holsteiner Tilsiter	PGI	2013
Nieheimer Käse	PGI	2010
Odenwälder Frühstückskäse	PDO	1997

== Greece ==
Designation	Latin	Type	Registration year
Ανεβατό	Anevato	PDO	1996
Μπάτζος	Batzos	PDO	1996
Φέτα	Feta	PDO	2002
Φορμαέλλα Αράχωβας Παρνασσού	Formaella Arachova Parnassos	PDO	1996
Γαλοτύρι	Galotyri	PDO	1996
Γραβιέρα Αγράφων	Graviera Agrafon	PDO	1996
Γραβιέρα Κρήτης	Graviera Kritis	PDO	1996
Γραβιέρα Νάξου	Graviera Naxou	PDO	1996
Καλαθάκι Λήμνου	Kalathaki Limnou	PDO	1996
Κασέρι	Kasseri	PDO	1996
Κατίκι Δομοκού	Katiki Domokou	PDO	1996
Κεφαλογραβιέρα	Kefalograviera	PDO	1996
Κοπανιστή	Kopanisti mykonou	PDO	1996
Λαδοτύρι Μυτιλήνης	Ladotyri Mytilinis	PDO	1996
Μανούρι	Manouri	PDO	1996
Μετσοβόνε	Metsovone	PDO	1996
Πηχτόγαλο Χανίων	Pichtogalo Chanion	PDO	1996
Σαν Μιχάλη	San Michali	PDO	1996
Σφέλα	Sfela	PDO	1996
Ξύγαλο Σητείας / Ξίγαλο Σητείας	Xygalo Sitεias	PDO	2011
Ξυνομυζήθρα Κρήτης	Xynomizithra	PDO	1996

== Ireland ==
Designation	Type	Registration year
Imokilly Regato	PDO	1999

== Italy ==
Designation	Type	Registration year
Asiago	PDO	1996
Bitto	PDO	1996
Bra	PDO	1996
Burrata di Andria	PGI	2016
Caciocavallo Silano	PDO	2003
Canestrato di Moliterno	PGI	2010
Canestrato Pugliese	PDO	1996
Casatella Trevigiana	PDO	2008
Casciotta d'Urbino	PDO	1996
Castelmagno	PDO	1996
Fiore Sardo	PDO	1996
Fontina	PDO	1996
Formaggella del Luinese	PDO	2011
Formaggio di Fossa di Sogliano	PDO	2009
Formai de Mut dell'Alta Valle Brembana	PDO	1996
Gorgonzola	PDO	1996
Grana Padano	PDO	1996
Montasio	PDO	1996
Monte Veronese	PDO	1996
Mozzarella di Bufala Campana	PDO	1996
Murazzano	PDO	1996
Nostrano Valtrompia	PDO	2012
Parmigiano Reggiano	PDO	1996
Pecorino di Filiano	PDO	2007
Pecorino di Picinisco	PDO	2013
Pecorino Romano	PDO	1996
Pecorino Sardo	PDO	1996
Pecorino Siciliano	PDO	1996
Pecorino Toscano	PDO	1996
Piacentinu Ennese	PDO	2011
Piave	PDO	2010
Provolone del Monaco	PDO	2010
Provolone Valpadana	PDO	1996
Puzzone di Moena / Spretz Tzaorì	PDO	2013
Quartirolo Lombardo	PDO	1996
Ragusano	PDO	1996
Raschera	PDO	1996
Robiola di Roccaverano	PDO	1996
Salva Cremasco	PDO	2011
Spressa delle Giudicarie	PDO	2003
Squacquerone di Romagna	PDO	2012
Stelvio; Stilfser	PDO	2007
Taleggio	PDO	1996
Toma Piemontese	PDO	1996
Valle d'Aosta Fromadzo	PDO	1996
Valtellina Casera	PDO	1996
Vastedda della valle del Belìce	PDO	2010

== Lithuania ==
Designation	Type	Registration year
Lietuviškas varškės sūris	PGI	2013
Liliputas	PGI	2015
Džiugas	PGI	2019

== Netherlands ==
Designation	Type	Registration year
Boerenkaas	TSG	2007
Boeren-Leidse met sleutels	PDO	1997
Edam Holland	PGI	2010
Gouda Holland	PGI	2010
Kanterkaas; Kanternagelkaas; Kanterkomijnekaas	PDO	2000
Noord-Hollandse Edammer	PDO	1996
Noord-Hollandse Gouda	PDO	1996

== Poland ==
Designation	Type	Registration year
Bryndza Podhalańska	PDO	2007
Oscypek	PDO	2008
Redykołka	PDO	2009
Ser koryciński swojski	PGI	2012
Wielkopolski ser smażony	PGI	2009

== Portugal ==
Designation	Type	Registration year
Queijo de Azeitão	PDO	1996
Queijo de Cabra Transmontano/Queijo de Cabra Transmontano Velho	PDO	1996
Queijo de Évora	PDO	1996
Queijo de Nisa	PDO	1996
Queijo do Pico	PDO	1998
Queijo mestiço de Tolosa	PGI	2000
Queijo Rabaçal	PDO	1996
Queijo S. Jorge	PDO	1996
Queijo Serpa	PDO	1996
Queijo Serra da Estrela	PDO	1996
Queijo Terrincho	PDO	1996
Queijos da Beira Baixa (Queijo de Castelo Branco, Queijo Amarelo da Beira Baixa, Queijo Picante da Beira Baixa)	PDO	1996

== Romania ==
Designation	Type	Registration year
Telemea de Ibănești	PDO	2017
Telemea de Sibiu	PGI	2019

== Serbia ==
Designation	Type	Registration year
Homolje cheese (homoljski sir)	PGI	
Krivi Vir caciocavallo (krivovirski kačkavalj)	PGI	
Svrljig caciocavallo (svrljiški kačkavalj)	PGI	

== Slovakia ==
Designation	Type	Registration year
Oravský korbáčik	PGI	2011
Slovenská bryndza	PGI	2008
Slovenská parenica	PGI	2008
Slovenský oštiepok	PGI	2008
Tekovský salámový syr	PGI	2011
Zázrivský korbáčik	PGI	2011

== Slovenia ==
Designation	Type	Registration year
Bovški sir	PDO	2012
Mohant	PDO	2013
Nanoški sir	PDO	2011
Tolminc	PDO	2012

== Spain ==
Designation	Type	Registration year
Afuega'l Pitu	PDO	2008
Arzùa-Ulloa	PDO	2010
Cabrales	PDO	1996
Cebreiro	PDO	2008
Gamoneu; Gamonedo	PDO	2008
Idiazábal	PDO	1996
Mahón-Menorca	PDO	1996
Picón Bejes-Tresviso	PDO	1996
Queso Camerano	PDO	2012
Queso Casín	PDO	2011
Queso de Flor de Guía / Queso de Media Flor de Guía / Queso de Guía	PDO	2010
Queso de La Serena	PDO	1996
Queso de l'Alt Urgell y la Cerdanya	PDO	2000
Queso de Murcia	PDO	2002
Queso de Murcia al vino	PDO	2002
Queso de Valdeón	PGI	2004
Queso Ibores	PDO	2005
Queso Los Beyos	PGI	2013
Queso Majorero	PDO	1999
Queso Manchego	PDO	1996
Queso Nata de Cantabria	PDO	2007
Queso Palmero; Queso de la Palma	PDO	2002
Queso Tetilla	PDO	1996
Queso Zamorano	PDO	1996
Quesucos de Liébana	PDO	1996
Roncal	PDO	2003

== Sweden ==
Designation	Type	Registration year
Svecia	PGI	1997

== United Kingdom ==
Designation	Type	Registration year
Beacon Fell traditional Lancashire cheese	PDO	1996
Bonchester cheese	PDO	1996
Buxton blue	PDO	1996
Dorset Blue Cheese	PGI	1998
Dovedale cheese	PDO	1996
Exmoor Blue Cheese	PGI	1999
Orkney Scottish Island Cheddar	PGI	2013
Single Gloucester	PDO	1996
Staffordshire Cheese	PDO	2007
Swaledale cheese	PDO	1996
Swaledale ewes´ cheese	PDO	1996
Teviotdale Cheese	PGI	1998
Traditional Ayrshire Dunlop	PGI	2015
Traditional Welsh Caerphilly	PGI	2018
West Country farmhouse Cheddar cheese	PDO	1996
White Stilton cheese; Blue Stilton cheese	PDO	1996
Yorkshire Wensleydale	PGI	2013

== See also ==
- List of French Protected Designations of Origin cheeses
- List of Greek Protected Designations of Origin cheeses
- List of Italian PDO cheeses
- List of Portuguese cheeses with protected status
- List of cheeses
