= List of Italian PDO cheeses =

Food with protected designation of origin status

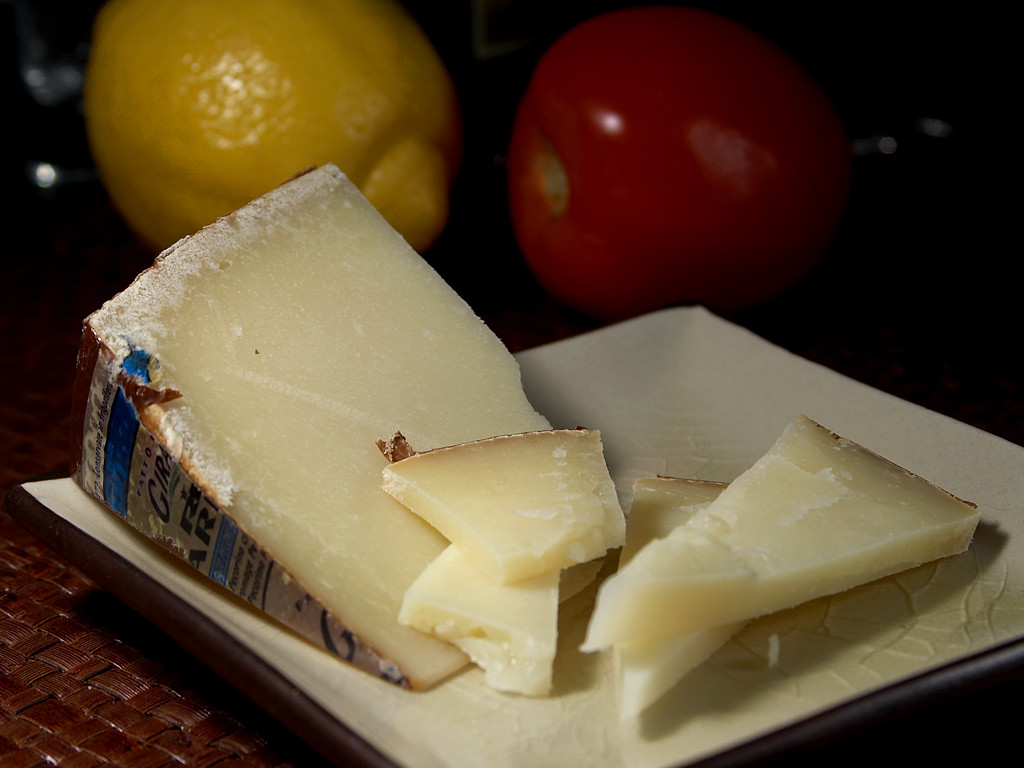
Pecorino Sardo PDO/DOP

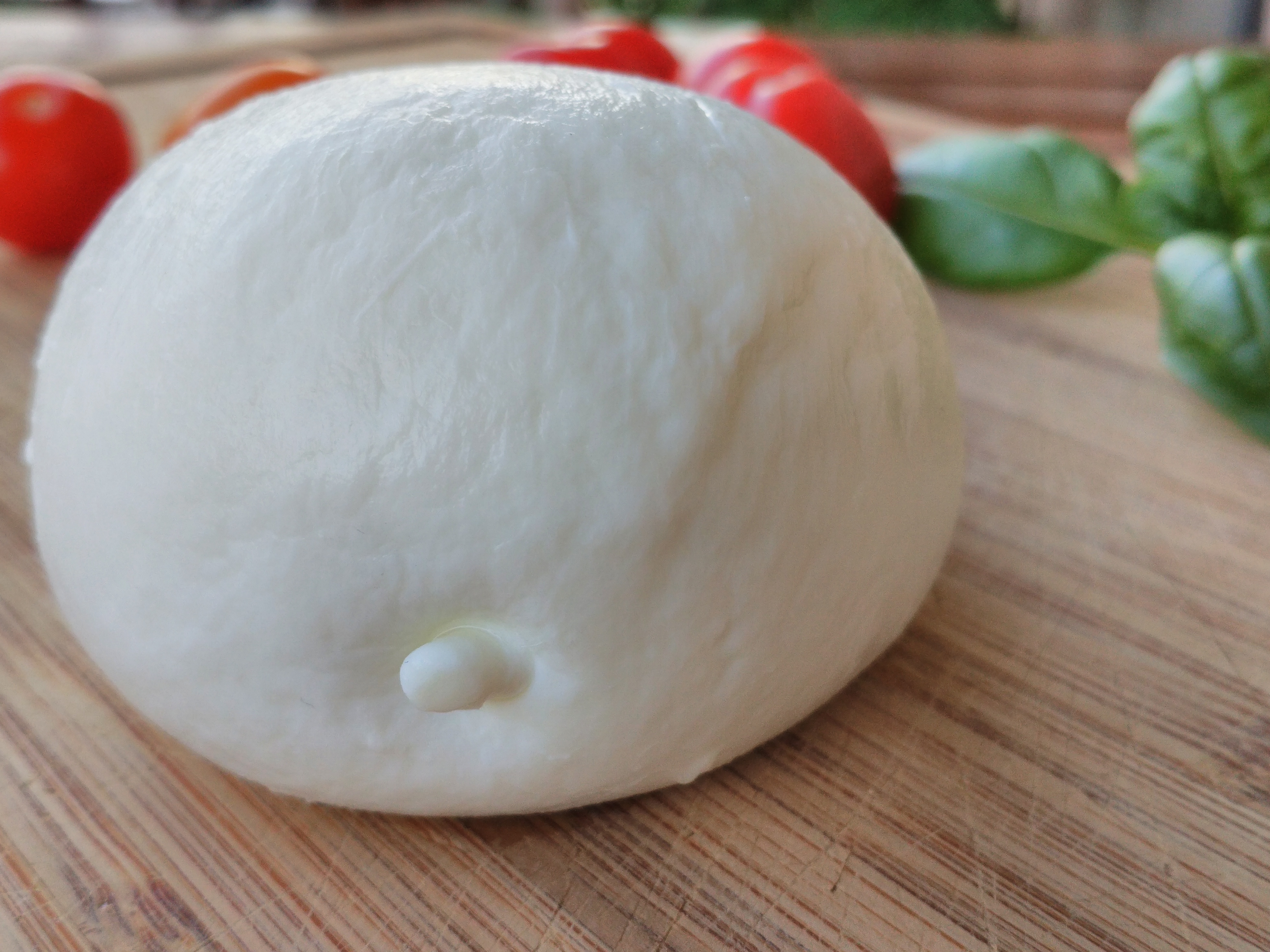
Mozzarella di Bufala Campana ("Campana buffalo mozzarella") PDO/DOP)

This List of Italian PDO/DOP cheeses includes all the Italian cheeses which have protected designation of origin (denominazione di origine protetta, or DOP/PDO), status under European Union regulations. All of the formerly existing "DO" cheeses (protected under Italian law) were registered in the EU as "PDO/DOP" cheeses during the course of 1996. They have the Italian abbreviation for PDO (DOP) written on the cheese.

Prior to 1996 when the PDO system came into operation, many Italian cheeses were regulated under a denominazione di origine (DO) system, which arose out of the 1951 Stresa Conference and was established under the Italian law 125/54. These appellations of origin were recognized in a number of European countries with which Italy had bilateral agreements. The international framework of recognition was further developed, and extended from cheese to include other agricultural products, by the Lisbon Agreement for the Protection of Appellations of Origin and their International Registration, and the modifications made to it at Stockholm in 1967. Italian cheeses protected under this agreement remain protected. Geographical indications are also protected through the TRIPS Agreement of 1994.

== Italian PDO/DOP cheeses ==
The following table indicates for each cheese the year in which it acquired DO status (where applicable), the year of PDO/DOP registration and the approximate area within which the regulations permit it to be produced.

Key to acronyms

- DO: Denominazione di Origine (Appellation of Origin)
- DOP: Denominazione di Origine Protetta (PDO, or Protected Designation of Origin)
- DPR: Decreto del Presidente della Repubblica (Presidential Decree)
- DPCM: Decreto del Presidente del Consiglio (Prime-ministerial Decree)
- PDO: Protected Designation of Origin

List of DOP/PDO Italian cheeses
| Name and styles | DO | DOP/PDO | Milk | Production zone | |
| Name and styles | DO | DOP/PDO | Milk | | Provinces |
|---|---|---|---|---|---|
| Asiago; Asiago d'allevo "mezzano" Asiago d'allevo "vecchio" Asiago pressato | 1978 | 1996 | Cow | Veneto | Padua (part), Treviso (part), Vicenza |
| Asiago; Asiago d'allevo "mezzano" Asiago d'allevo "vecchio" Asiago pressato | 1978 | 1996 | Cow | Trentino-Alto Adige/Südtirol | Trentino |
| Bitto | 1995 | 1996 | Cow (80%); Goat (20%) | Lombardy | Bergamo, Sondrio |
| Bra dura tenera di Alpeggio | 1982 | 1996 | Cow | Piedmont | Cuneo, Turin |
| Caciocavallo Silano | 1993 | 1996 | Cow | Apulia | Bari, Taranto, Brindisi |
| Caciocavallo Silano | 1993 | 1996 | Cow | Calabria | Crotone, Catanzaro, Cosenza |
| Caciocavallo Silano | 1993 | 1996 | Cow | Campania | Avellino, Benevento, Caserta, Naples |
| Caciocavallo Silano | 1993 | 1996 | Cow | Molise | (Entire territory) |
| Caciocavallo Silano | 1993 | 1996 | Cow | Basilicata | Matera, Potenza |
| Canestrato Pugliese | 1985 | 1996 | Sheep | Apulia | (Entire territory) |
| Casatella Trevigiana | | 2008 | Cow | Veneto | Treviso |
| Casciotta d'Urbino | 1982 | 1996 | Sheep (70%–80%); Cow (20%–30%) | Marche | Province of Pesaro and Urbino |
| Castelmagno | 1982 | 1996 | Cow; Sheep and/or Goat (optionally a little) | Piedmont | Cuneo |
| Fiore Sardo | 1955 | 1996 | Sheep | Sardinia | Cagliari, Nuoro, Oristano, Sassari |
| Fontina | 1955 | 1996 | Cow | Aosta Valley | (Entire territory) |
| Formaggella del Luinese | | 2011 | Goat | Lombardy | Varese (Alpine foothills in the north of the province) |
| Formaggio di Fossa di Sogliano | | 2009 | Sheep and/or Cow | Emilia-Romagna | Bologna (part), Forlì-Cesena, Ravenna, Rimini |
| Formaggio di Fossa di Sogliano | | 2009 | Sheep and/or Cow | Marche | Ancona, Ascoli Piceno, Macerata, Pesaro-Urbino |
| Formai de Mut from Alta Valle Brembana | 1985 | 1996 | Cow | Lombardy | Bergamo |
| Gorgonzola | 1955 | 1996 | Cow | Piedmont | Novara, Vercelli, |
| Gorgonzola | 1955 | 1996 | Cow | Lombardy | Bergamo, Brescia, Como, Cremona, Lodi, Milan, Pavia |
| Grana Padano | 1955 | 1996 | Cow | Lombardy | Lodi, Bergamo, Brescia, Como, Cremona, Mantova (to the north of the Po), Milan, Pavia, Sondrio, Lecco, Varese |
| Grana Padano | 1955 | 1996 | Cow | Piedmont | Alessandria, Asti, Cuneo, Novara, Turin, Vercelli |
| Grana Padano | 1955 | 1996 | Cow | Trentino-Alto Adige/Südtirol | Trento |
| Grana Padano | 1955 | 1996 | Cow | Veneto | Padua, Rovigo, Treviso, Venice, Verona, Vicenza |
| Grana Padano | 1955 | 1996 | Cow | Emilia-Romagna | Bologna (east of the Reno), Ferrara, Forlì-Cesena, Piacenza, Ravenna, Rimini |
| Montasio | 1986 | 1996 | Cow | Friuli-Venezia Giulia | Udine, Pordenone, Gorizia, Trieste |
| Montasio | 1986 | 1996 | Cow | Veneto | Belluno, Treviso, Padua, Venice |
| Monte Veronese | 1993 | 1996 | Cow | Veneto | Verona |
| Mozzarella di Bufala Campana | 1993 | 1996 | Italian buffalo | Apulia | Province of Foggia |
| Mozzarella di Bufala Campana | 1993 | 1996 | Italian buffalo | Campania | Province of Caserta, Province of Salerno, Province of Naples, Province of Benevento |
| Mozzarella di Bufala Campana | 1993 | 1996 | Italian buffalo | Lazio | Province of Frosinone, Province of Latina, province of Rome |
| Mozzarella di Bufala Campana | 1993 | 1996 | Italian buffalo | Molise | Venafro |
| Mozzarella di Gioia del Colle | 1950 | 2020 | Cow | Apulia Basilicata | Province of Bari Province of Taranto Province of Matera |
| Murazzano | 1982 | 1986 | Sheep (60%–100%); Cow (0%–40%) | Piedmont | Province of Cuneo |
| Parmigiano-Reggiano | 1955 | 1996 | Cow | Emilia‑Romagna | Modena, Parma, Reggio Emilia, Bologna (west of the Reno) |
| Parmigiano-Reggiano | 1955 | 1996 | Cow | Lombardy | Mantova (south of the Po) |
| Pecorino di Filiano | | 2007 | Sheep | Basilicata | Potenza |
| Pecorino Romano | 1955 | 1996 | Sheep | Lazio | Rome |
| Pecorino Romano | 1955 | 1996 | Sheep | Tuscany | Grosseto |
| Pecorino Romano | 1955 | 1996 | Sheep | Sardinia | (Entire Region) |
| Pecorino Sardo | 1991 | 1996 | Sheep | Sardinia | Cagliari, Nuoro, Oristano, Sassari |
| Pecorino Siciliano | 1955 | 1996 | Sheep | Sicily | (Entire territory) |
| Pecorino Toscano | 1986 | 1996 | Sheep | Tuscany | Arezzo, Pisa, Massa Carrara, Livorno, Grosseto, Firenze, Prato, Lucca, Pistoia, Siena |
| Pecorino di Crotone | | 2014 | Sheep | Calabria | Province of Crotone |
| Piacentinu Ennese | | 2011 | Sheep | Sicily | Enna (only within the commune of Enna) |
| Piave | | 2010 | Cow | Veneto | Province of Belluno |
| Provolone del Monaco | | 2010 | Cow | Campania | Naples |
| Provolone Valpadana | 1993 | 1996 | Cow | Lombardy | Bergamo, Brescia, Cremona, Mantova, Milan |
| Provolone Valpadana | 1993 | 1996 | Cow | Veneto | Padua, Rovigo, Verona, Vicenza |
| Provolone Valpadana | 1993 | 1996 | Cow | Emilia‑Romagna | Piacenza |
| Provolone Valpadana | 1993 | 1996 | Cow | Trentino-Alto Adige/Südtirol | Trento |
| Puzzone di Moena | | 2014 | Cow | Trentino-Alto Adige/Südtirol | Val di Fassa Moena Val di Fiemme (district) Valle di Primiero |
| Quartirolo Lombardo | 1993 | 1996 | Cow | Lombardy | Bergamo, Brescia, Como, Cremona, Lodi, Milan, Pavia, Varese |
| Ragusano | 1995 | 1996 | Cow | Sicily | Ragusa, Syracuse |
| Raschera | 1982 | 1996 | Cow; Sheep and/or Goat (optionally a little) | Piedmont | Cuneo |
| Ricotta Romana | | 2005 | | Lazio | (Entire territory) |
| Robiola di Roccaverano | 1979 | 1996 | Cow (max 85%); Sheep and/or Goat (min 15%) | Piedmont | Provinces of Alessandria, Asti |
| Salva Cremasco | | 2011 | Cow | Lombardy | Lowlands of Cremasco, Bergamo and Brescia |
| Spressa delle Giudicarie | | 2003 | Cow | Trentino-Alto Adige/Südtirol | Western Trentino |
| Stelvio or Stilfser | | 2007 | Cow | Trentino-Alto Adige/Südtirol | South Tyrol |
| Taleggio | 1988 | 1996 | Cow | Lombardy | Bergamo, Brescia, Como, Cremona, Lodi, Milan, Pavia |
| Taleggio | 1988 | 1996 | Cow | Veneto | Treviso |
| Taleggio | 1988 | 1996 | Cow | Piedmont | Novara |
| Toma Piemontese | 1993 | 1996 | Cow | Piedmont | Alessandria, Asti, Biella, Cuneo, Novara, Turin, Vercelli |
| Valle d'Aosta Fromadzo (or Vallée d'Aoste Fromadzo) | 1995 | 1996 | Cow | Aosta Valley | (Entire territory) |
| Valtellina Casera | 1995 | 1996 | Cow | Lombardy | Province of Sondrio |
| Vastedda della valle del Belìce | | 2010 | Sheep | Sicily | Agrigento (part), Trapani (part), Palermo (part) |

== Applications under consideration ==
Applications have been made for DOP status in the case of the following cheeses:

- Nostrano di Valle Trompia, a cows' milk cheese, coloured with saffron, produced in the Valle Trompia region of the province of Brescia (Lombardy). The application was submitted on 22 September 2010.
- Pecorino di Picinisco, a sheep's milk cheese (with the optional inclusion of up to 25% goats' milk), produced in the Valle di Comino region of the province of Frosinone (Lazio). The application was submitted on 28 February 2011.
- Squacquerone di Romagna, a cows' milk cheese from the region of Emilia-Romagna in the provinces of Ravenna, Forlì-Cesena, Rimini and Bologna, and in part of the province of Ferrara. The application was submitted on 4 December 2009.

== See also ==
- Italian cuisine
- List of Italian cheeses
