= Pecorino (disambiguation) =

Pecorino is a hard Italian cheeses made from sheep's milk. Varieties include:

- Pecorino di Filiano
- Pecorino romano
- Pecorino sardo
- Pecorino siciliano
- Pecorino toscano
- Red Pecorino

Pecorino may also refer to:

- Pecorino (grape), white Italian wine grape variety
- Emanuele Pecorino (born 2001), Italian professional footballer

== See also ==
- Pecora (disambiguation)
