= Pecorino =

Hard Italian sheep's milk cheese

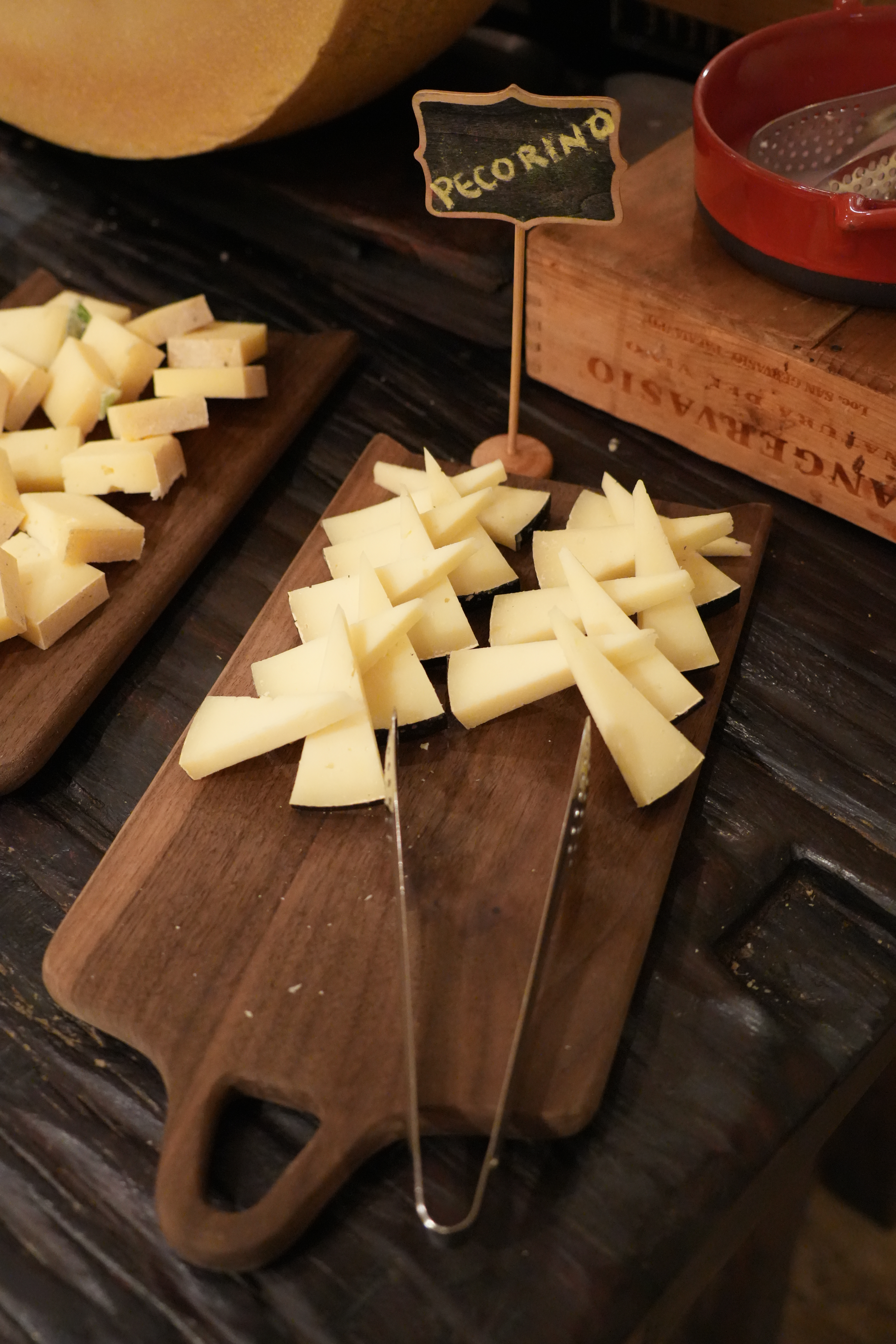
- Country of origin: Italy
- Source of milk: Sheep
- Texture: Hard

Pecorino is an Italian hard cheese produced from sheep's milk. The name pecorino derives from pecora, which means 'sheep' in Italian.

== Overview ==
Ultra-aged pecorino sardo cheese, produced in Sardinia and distributed from Genoa

Of the six main varieties of pecorino, all of which have protected designation of origin (PDO) status under European Union law, pecorino romano is probably the best known outside Italy.

Most pecorino romano is produced on the island of Sardinia, although its production zone also includes Lazio and the Tuscan provinces of Grosseto and Siena. Ancient Roman authors wrote about this cheese and its production technique.

The other five mature PDO cheeses are the pecorino sardo from Sardinia (casu berbeghinu in Sardinian language); pecorino toscano, whose production was already attested by Pliny the Elder in his Natural History; pecorino siciliano (or picurinu sicilianu in Sicilian); pecorino di Filiano from Basilicata; and pecorino crotonese from the province of Crotone, in Calabria. Two other well-known pecorinos are pecorino di Amatrice (from the comune of Amatrice, which was also the origin of amatriciana sauce) and the one that was produced in Abruzzo, the pecorino di Atri.

== Varieties ==
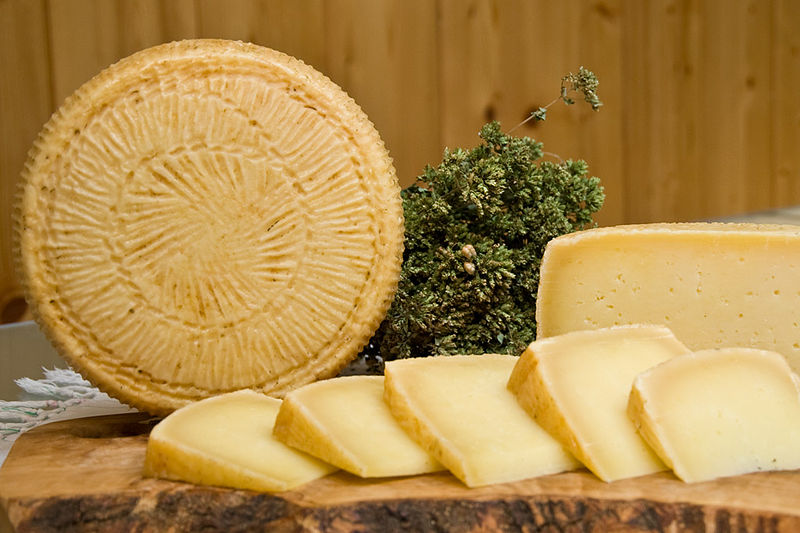
Pecorino di Filiano

Red pecorino, also known as pecorino Rosso, originates from Sicily, where the cheese is coated repeatedly with olive oil and tomato sauce, giving it its red colour and creating a protective layer on the rind as the cheese matures. It is included in the list of food products of traditional Italian cuisine (A.P.T), the Ministry of Agriculture, Food and Forestry.

In Sardinia, the larvae of the cheese fly are intentionally introduced into pecorino sardo to produce casu martzu. As it is illegal, it is primarily sold through the black market.

== See also ==
Media related to Pecorino at Wikimedia Commons

- List of Italian cheeses
- List of Italian DOP cheeses – food with protected designation of origin status
- Pecorino di Carmasciano
- Pecorino di Filiano
- Pecorino romano
- Pecorino sardo
- Pecorino siciliano
- Pecorino toscano
