= Pecora (disambiguation) =

Pecora is a group of hoofed mammals that comprises most of the ruminants.

Pecora may also refer to:

- An occasional spelling of the Pechora River
- Pecora (river), a watercourse in Tuscany, Italy
- Pecora Escarpment, Antarctica
- Coda di Pecora, a grape variety

== People ==
- Andrew Pecora (born 1957), American hematologist and oncologist
- Ferdinand Pecora (1882–1971), American lawyer, judge, and Chief Counsel to the United States Senate Committee on Banking and Currency
  - Pecora Commission
- Frank Pecora (1930-2017), Pennsylvania State Senator
- Nofio Pecora, Italian-American mobster
- Santo Pecora (1902–1984), American jazz trombonist
- Tom Pecora (born 1961), American basketball coach
- William Thomas Pecora (1913–1972), American geologist.

== See also ==
- Pechora (disambiguation)
- Pecorino (disambiguation)
- Pacora
- Pakora
