= Pechora (disambiguation) =

Pechora is a town in the Komi Republic, Russia.

Pechora may also refer to:

- Pechera, Ukraine, Russian: Pechora, Romanian: Peciora, village in the Vinnytsia Oblast of Ukraine, located along the Southern Bug river in the Tulchin region (formerly Shpikov region)
- Pechora concentration camp located in Pechera, Ukraine from 1941-1944.
- Pechora Airport (IATA: PEX, ICAO: UUYP) is an airport in the Komi Republic, Russia
- Pechora Kamenka is a military air base in the Komi Republic, Russia
- S-125 Neva/Pechora, NATO reporting name SA-3 Goa, is a Soviet surface-to-air missile system
- Pechora Radar Station in the Komi Republic, Russia.
- Pechora (river) is a major river in Russia (Komi Republic and Nenets Autonomous Okrug)
- Pechora Sea is a sea at the northwest of Russia, the southeastern part of the Barents Sea
- Pechora pipit (Anthus gustavi) is a small passerine bird breeding in tundra
- Pechora is the NATO reporting name for Daryal radar
- Pechora tribe

== See also ==
- Pecora (disambiguation)
- Pechory, town in Pskov Oblast, Russia.
