= Pani câ meusa =

Sicilian street food

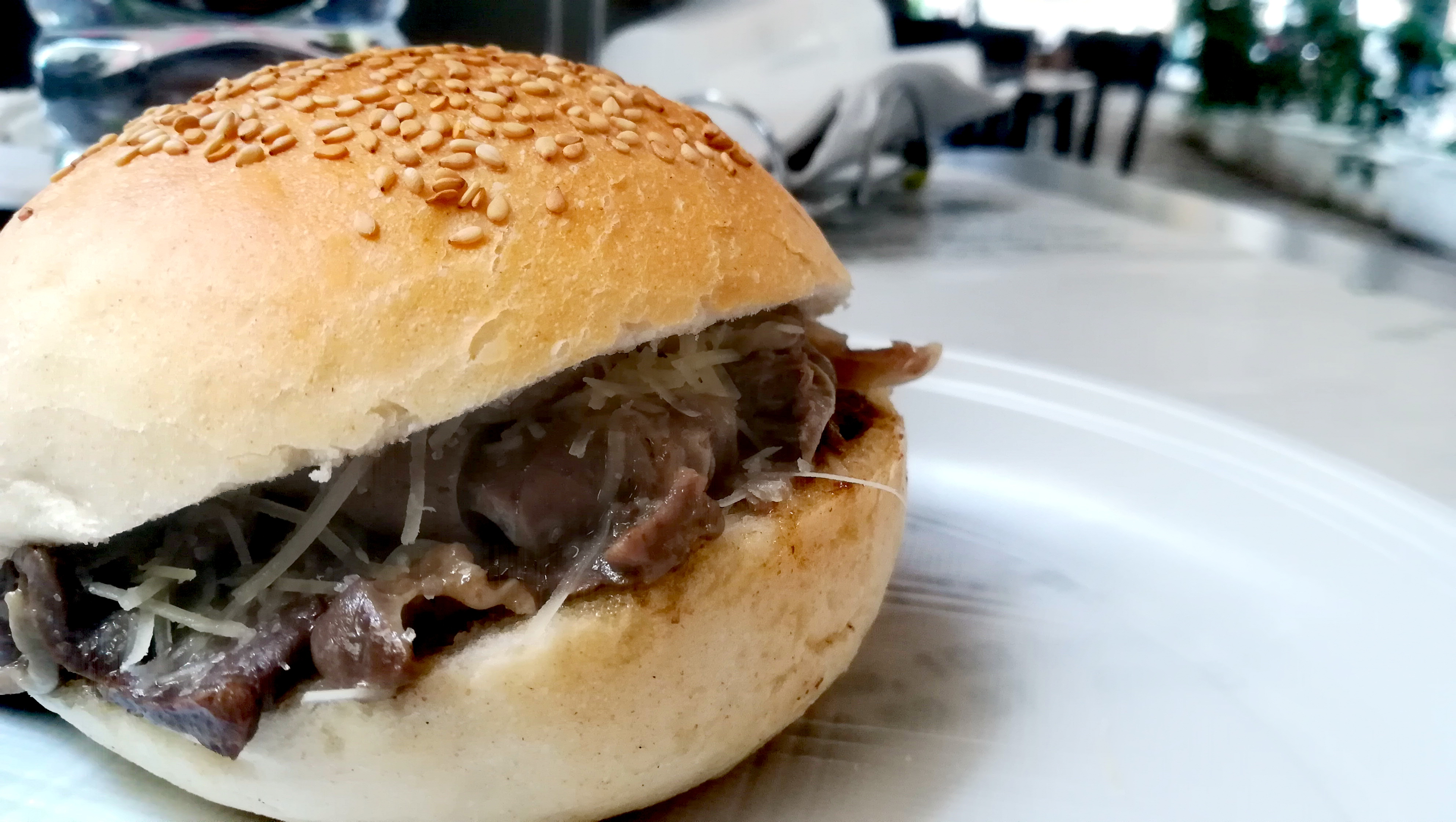
Pani câ meusa served in Palermo, Italy

Pani câ meusa (Sicilian: [ˈpaːnɪ kaː ˈmɛʊsa]; lit. 'bread with spleen'), also spelled pani câ mèusa (or less correctly pani ca meusa), is a Sicilian street food. Its Italianized name is panino con la milza. It is a dish typical of Palermo and it consists of a soft bread (locally called vastedda or vastella) topped with sesame, stuffed with chopped veal lung and spleen that have been boiled and then fried in lard. Caciocavallo or ricotta may also be added, in which case the pani câ meusa is called maritatu (lit. 'married'); if served without cheese, it is called schettu ('single') instead. It was created by Jewish butchers in Palermo, Sicily. It is sold mainly by street vendors (specifically indicated locally as meusari) in Palermo's main markets, such as the Vucciria and the Ballarò. The sandwich is a staple among locals in Palermo.

== See also ==
Media related to Pani ca meusa at Wikimedia Commons

- Vastedda
