= Monte Veronese =

Italian cheese

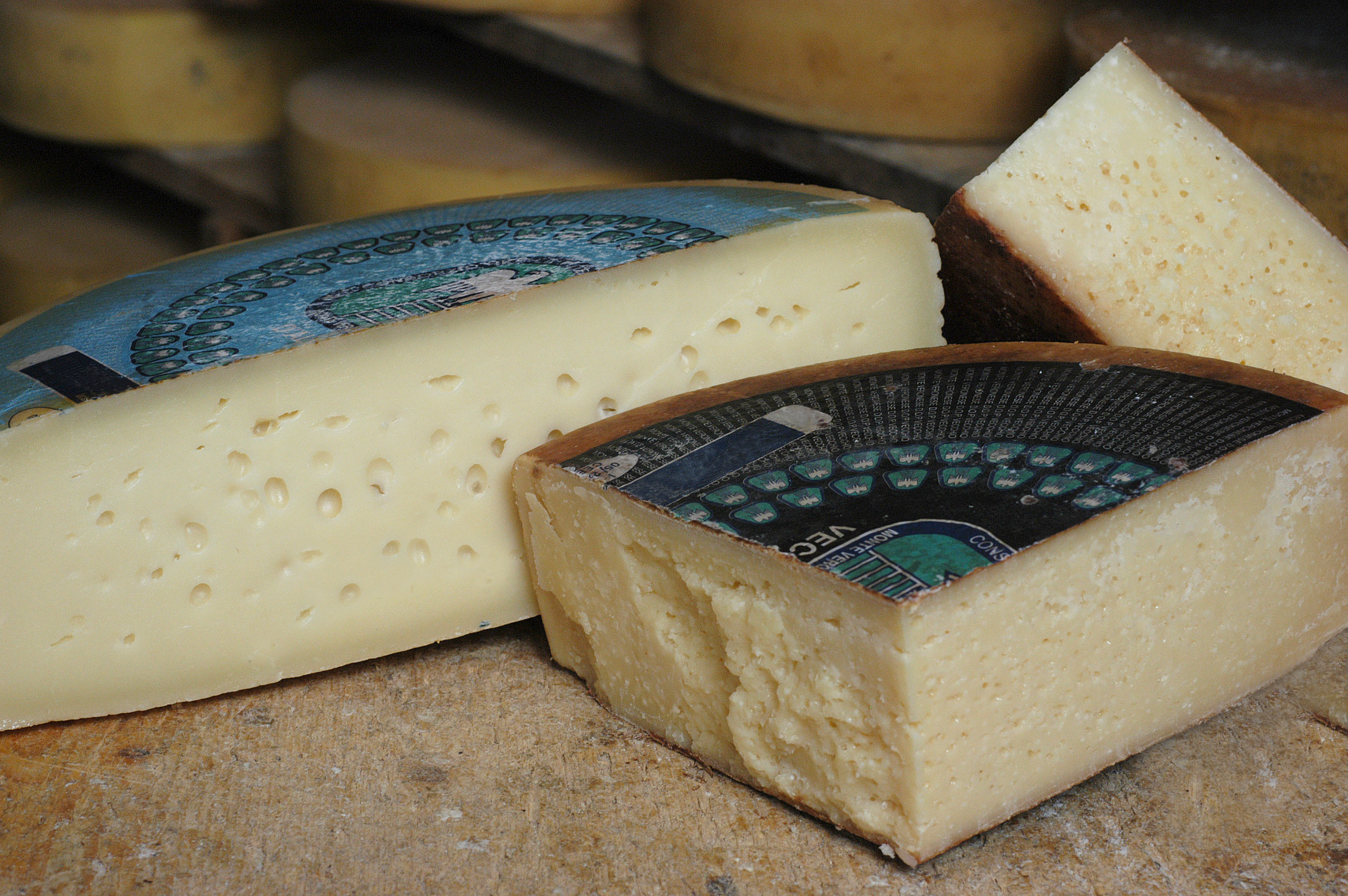
- Country of origin: Italy
- Town: Verona
- Source of milk: Cows
- Pasteurized: No
- Texture: Semi-hard
- Fat content: FDM; 44% (intero); 30% (d'allevo)
- Dimensions: Cylindrical, with almost flat faces and slightly convex sides Diameter 25–35 cm (9.8–13.8 in) Height 7–11 cm (2.8–4.3 in) (intero) 6–9 cm (2.4–3.5 in) (d'allevo)
- Weight: 7–10 kg (15–22 lb) (intero); 6–9 kg (13–20 lb) (d'allevo)
- Aging time: 25-60 days (intero) more than two months (d'allevo) up to 24 months (Stravecchio)
- Certification: DO 1993; PDO 1996

Monte Veronese is an Italian cheese made from cow's milk which is produced in the northern part of the province of Verona, more specifically in the Lessini Mountains or the Veronese prealps. Like Asiago it comes in two varieties, one fresh and one matured.

Monte Veronese was awarded Italian denominazione di origine status in 1993 and European protected designation of origin (Italian: DOP) status in 1996.

== Varieties ==
=== Monte Veronese latte intero ===
The fresh Monte Veronese is made from unpasteurized whole milk (latte intero in Italian) and has a brief aging period, from a minimum of 25 days to two months. The paste is white or slightly yellowish in color, with fine and uniformly distributed eyes, and has a sweet, intense flavor.

=== Monte Veronese d'allevo ===
The hard paste Monte Veronese is made from unpasteurized semi-skimmed milk. Aging lasts from more than 60 days, for wheels to be consumed as table cheese, to six months, for grating cheese. The paste is white or slightly yellowish in color but with larger eyes than the whole milk variety. Ripening makes the cheese fragrant and slightly piquant.

== See also ==
- List of Italian cheeses
