= Wielkopolski ser smażony =

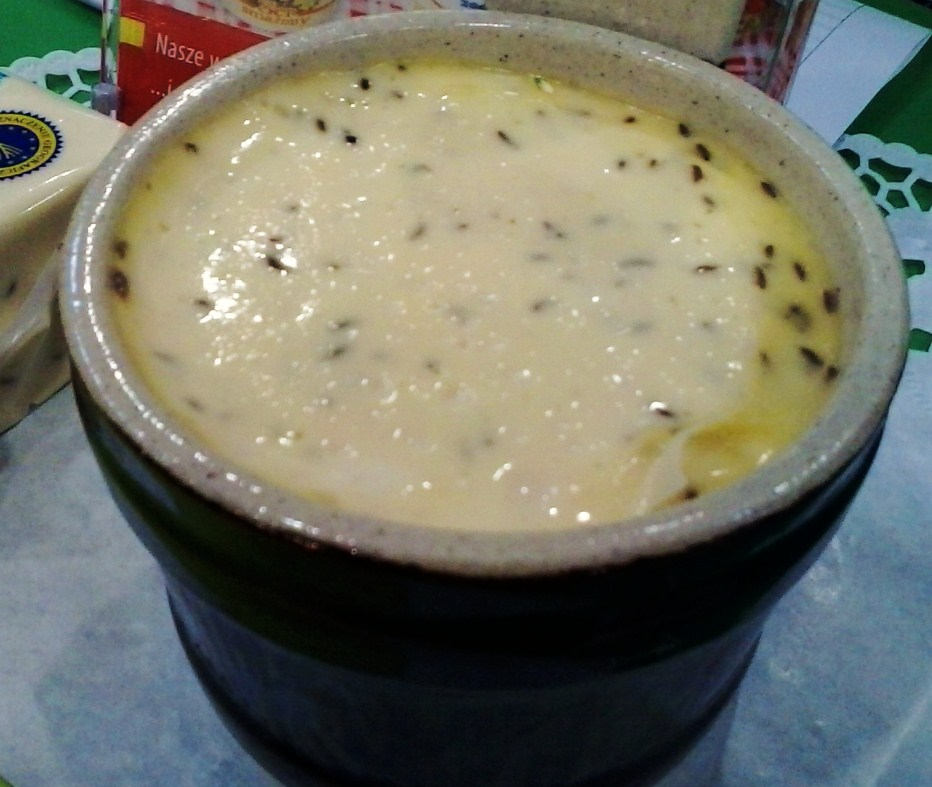
Wielkopolski ser smażony with caraway.

Wielkopolski ser smażony is a fried cheese produced in the Greater Poland Voivodeship. The cheese is firm and can be light cream to yellow in color with a sharp pungent taste. It is eaten as a melted dip similar to fondue, typically with a baguette or similar bread. It is either sold in a natural "pure" form or with caraway. It was given Protected Geographical Indication (PGI) status in 2009.
