= Katiki Domokou =

Greek cheese

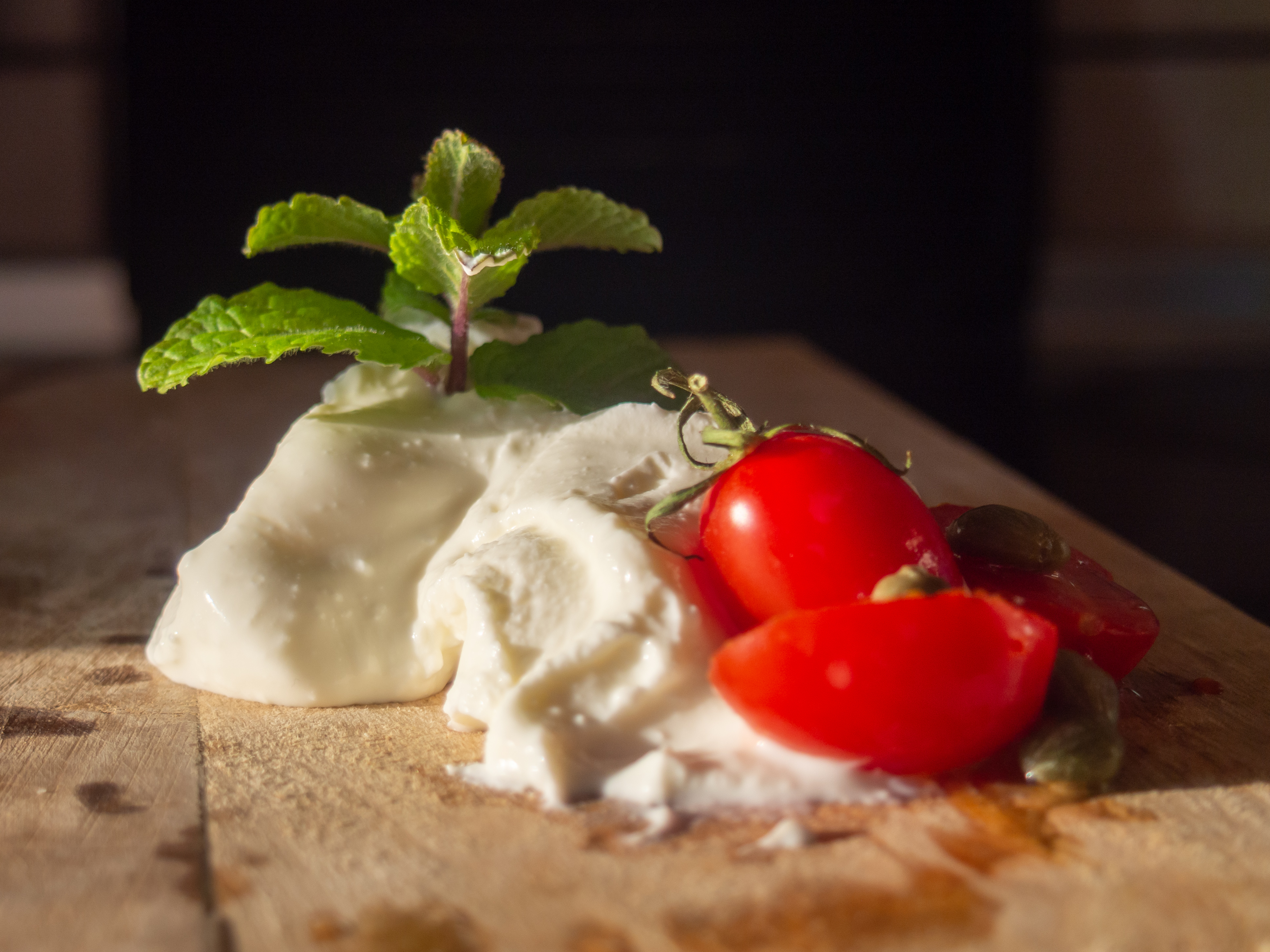
Katiki with spearmint, cherry tomatoes and caper

Katiki Domokou (Greek: Κατίκι Δομοκού) is a cheese made of goat and sheep milk. Its origin is from Domokos in Phthiotis prefecture. It is white in color. It is a soft cheese with a low fat content. The average nutritional value of 100 gr of the product is 169 kcal, 10 gr protein, 3 gr carbohydrates and 13 gr fat. It is a traditional product with protected designation of origin. It is made from pasteurised milk that curdles without rennet and it is drained in bags made of cloth. It is available for sale in many supermarkets.

It can be served on toast or dakos. It can be added to a salad as an ingredient and it fills pitas.
