= Mâconnais cheese =

French cheese

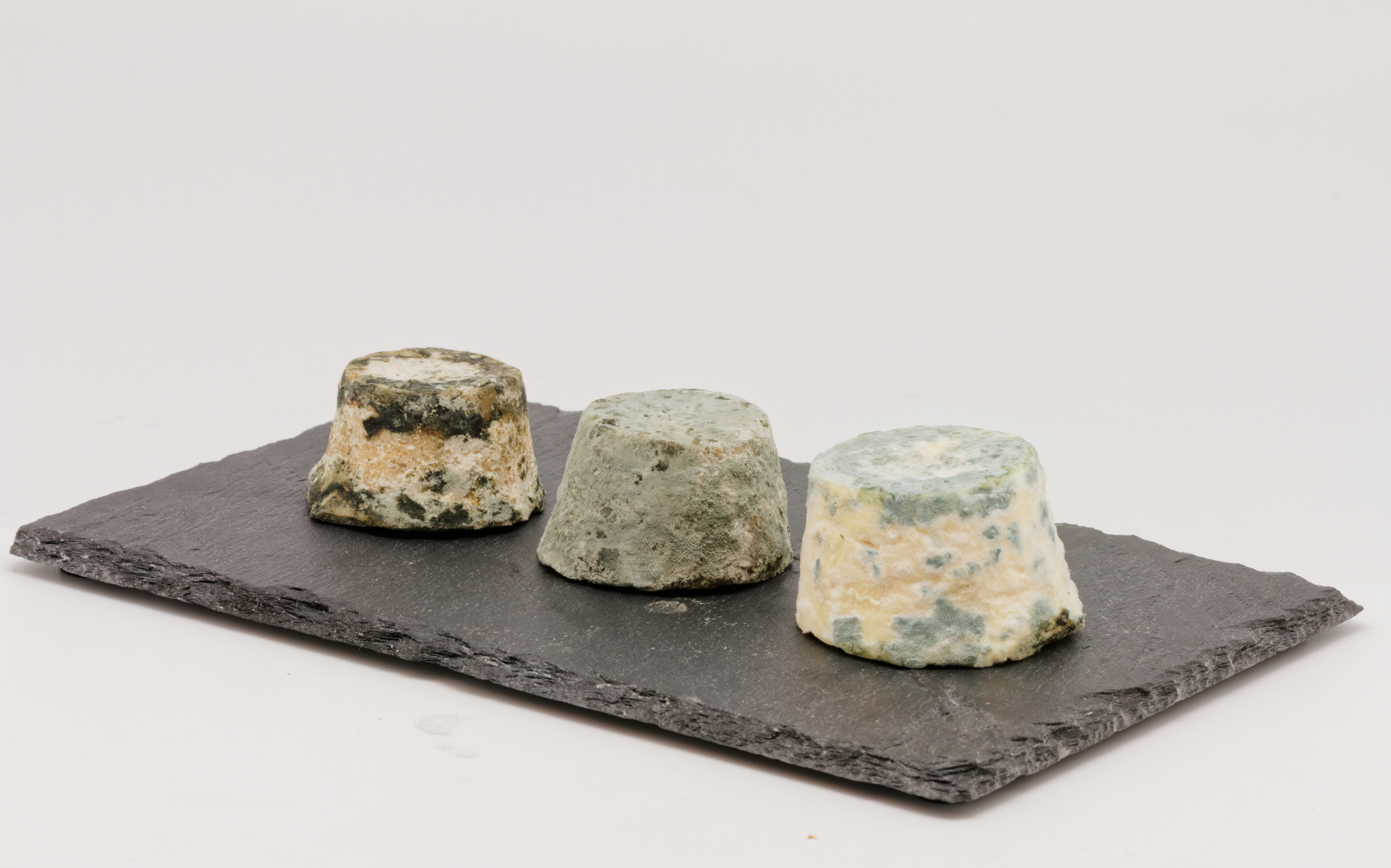
Mâconnais cheeses

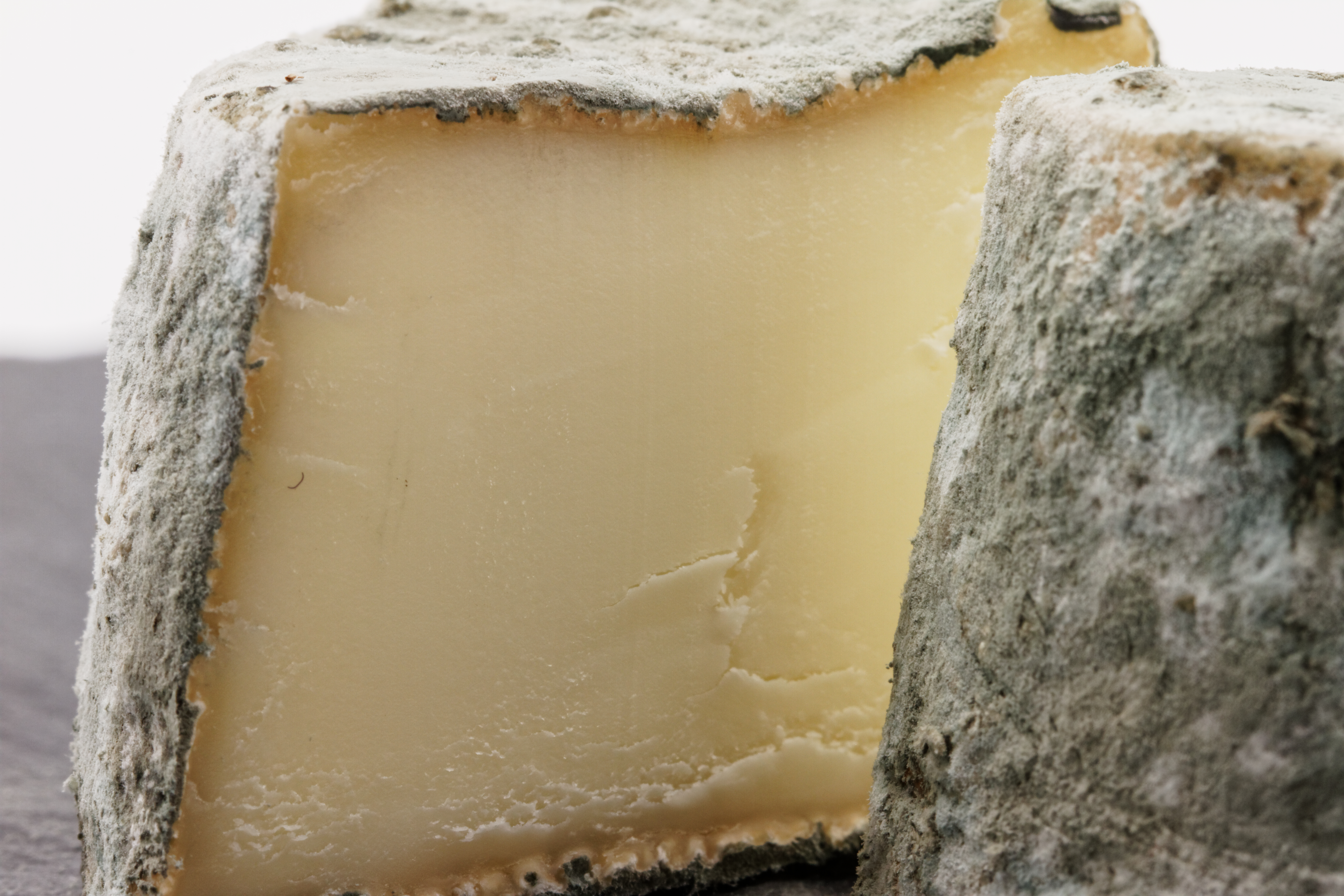
A cut Mâconnais

Maconnais (French pronunciation: [makɔnɛ]) is a small cheese produced in the French region of Burgundy. It is made from either goat's milk or a combination of goat's and cow's milk. Maconnais gained AOC certification in 2005.

A typical Maconnais is a small truncated cone approximately 4-5 cm wide and 3-4 cm thick, weighing 50-65 g.
