= Džiugas =

- Gender: Male
- Language: Lithuanian

Origin
- Origin: džiugus (joyous, happy)
- Region of origin: Lithuania

Other names
- Related names: Džiuga, Džiugilė (feminine forms)

Džiugas is a Lithuanian masculine given name. It is derived from the Lithuanian adjective džiugus meaning "joyous, cheerful, happy".

People bearing the name Džiugas include:

- Džiugas Bartkus (born 1989), Lithuanian footballer
- Džiugas Slavinskas (born 1998), Lithuanian basketball player

Džiugas might also refer to Lithuanian football club FC Džiugas Telšiai.
