= Puzzone di Moena =

Type of Italian cheese

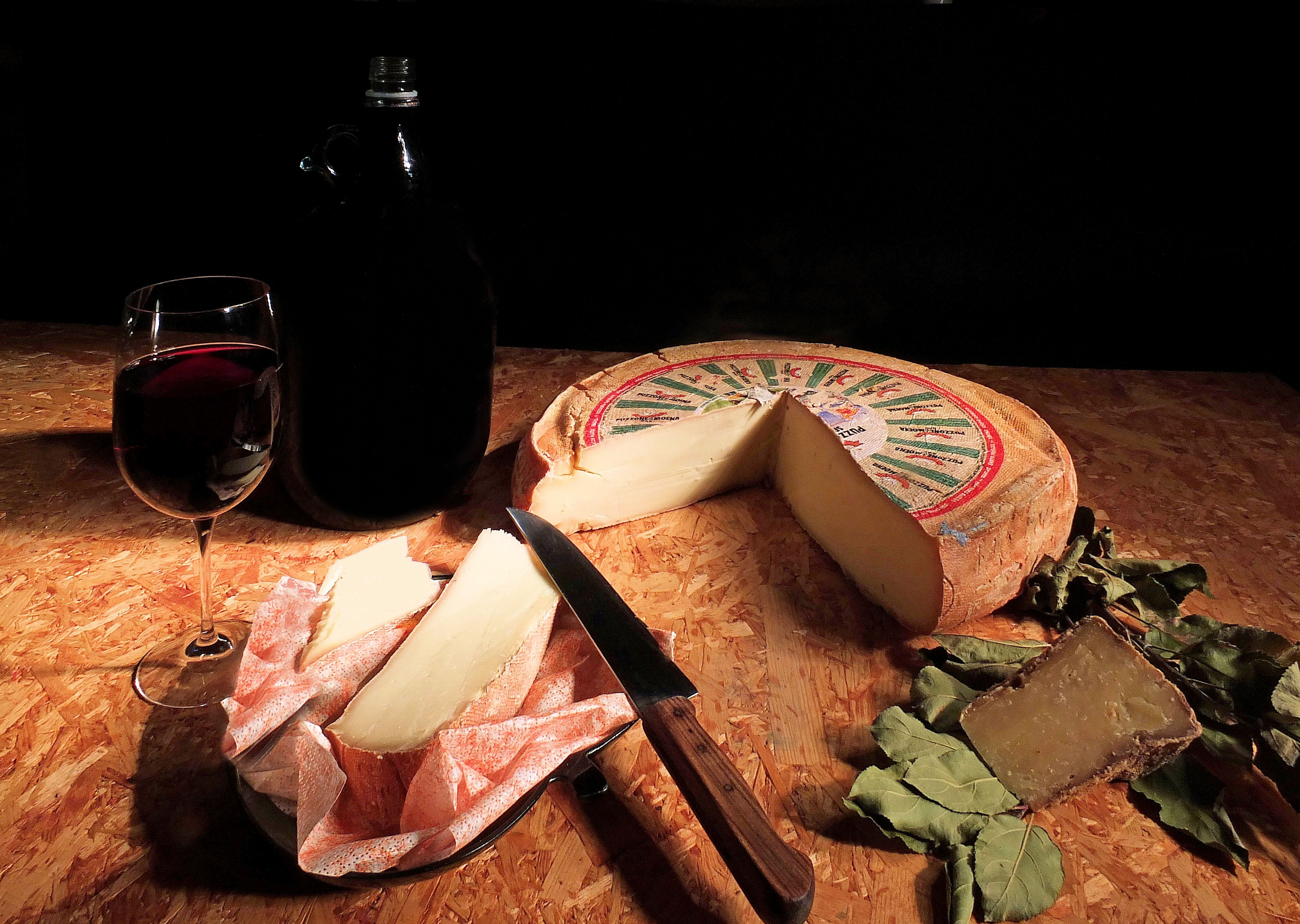
- Region or state: Trentino-Alto Adige
- Food energy (per serving): 350 kcal (100 gr)

Puzzone di Moena (in the Ladin language known as "Spretz tzaorì", lit. 'tasty pressed cheese'), is an Italian PDO cheese, with a washed rind, fat and semi-hard pressed paste made from raw cow's milk.

Puzzone di Moena is a typical cheese product of Moena and, more generally, of Val di Fassa, Val di Fiemme and Valle di Primiero, in Trentino-Alto Adige.

In March 2013 it has become PDO product (Puzzone di Moena was previously a PAT product).

== Etymology ==
The Ladin name spretz derives from the dialect word used to indicate the "spressa": the congealed cheese mass, pressed and squeezed from the fat (with the same meaning, see also Spressa delle Giudicarie DOP, another cheese from Trentino). In the past, mountain cheesemakers tried to "squeeze" as much butter as possible from cow's milk, which was considered a much more valuable product. What remained was therefore a low-fat cheese, consumed in the rural diet.

The Italian name "puzzone" (lit. 'big/large stinky') is due to the characteristic, slightly ammoniacal smell of the cheese. The flavour (on the palate), however, can seem less intense than other cheeses, such as blue cheeses.

== History ==
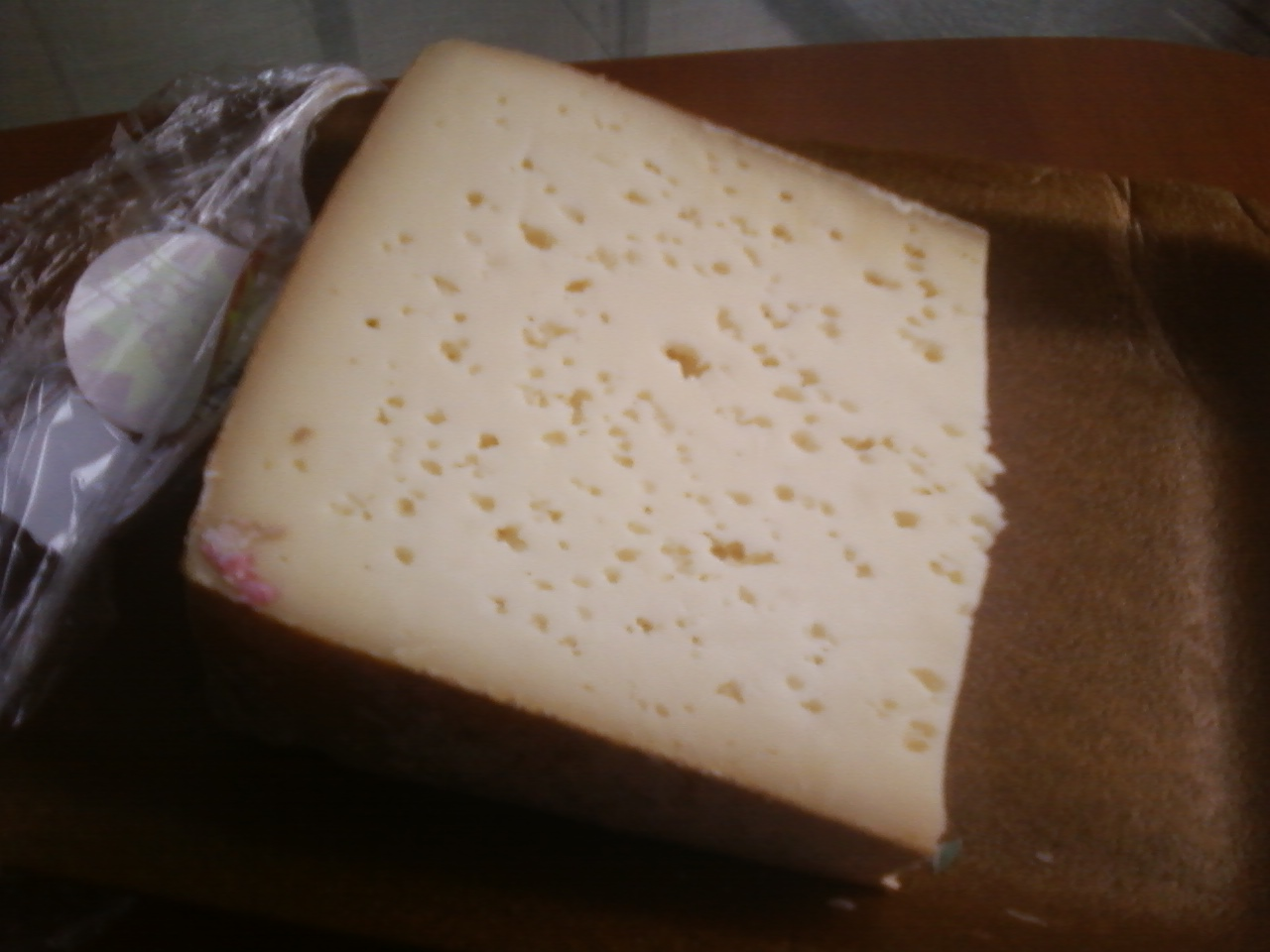
Puzzone di Moena

The origins of the cheese date back many decades, when in the mountain pastures, farms and dairies of the Val di Fassa a cheese generically called "Nostrano fassano" was produced, characterized by an unctuous rind and a tasty paste with a particularly strong smell. Similar cheeses were also typical of the neighboring Val di Fiemme ("Nostrano della Val di Fiemme") and Conca del Primiero ("Nostrano di Primiero").

After the First World War, the malgarians of Fassa began to wash their cheeses called "nostrani" with water and salt after they were collected from the dairies.

Nostrano Fassa cheese, for its taste and odor, accentuated to the point of spiciness and often salty, was particularly appreciated by the poor mountain farmers because, even in small quantities, it was able to give some flavor to the modest rural diet, which all too often was based on the consumption of polenta or potatoes.

In the summer of 1974, during a Sunday radio broadcast from the regional headquarters of the RAI in Trento, the "Nostrano Fassa cheese" of the social dairy of Moena was jokingly referred to as "Puzzone di Moena" (Smelly of Moena) because of its characteristic odor. The nickname was successful and since then it spread more and more, until it became the name commonly used to indicate this cheese, also used in official documents.

In 1984 Puzzone di Moena won the bronze medal at the Concours International des Fromages de Montagne of Grenoble (France).

In 2014, the cheese received PDO recognition from the European Union.

== Characteristics ==
- Semi-hard, light straw-colored paste with scattered small to medium-sized eyes
- flavor: robust, slightly spicy, with a slight bitter aftertaste
- Penetrating and characteristic odor, with hints of animals and understory, hints of ammonia
- Semi-cooked cheese made of whole "raw" milk, heated to 44 °C (111 °F)
- Cylindrical shape with heel of 9 to 11 cm (3.5 to 4.3 in), diameter of about 35 cm (14 in), weight about 10 kg (22 lb)
- Seasoning from three months to six months
- Rind washed, brick red in color and characteristically greasy

== Processing method ==
During the first weeks, the cheeses are turned over and wetted twice a week with warm, slightly salted water; subsequently, the treatment is carried out once a week until the end of the maturing process (from 3 to 8 months) in a cool, humid environment. In this way a patina is formed that envelops the cheese, favors the fermentation of the paste and forms an unctuous coating on the rind.

== See also ==
- List of Italian cheeses
- PDO products
- Stinky tofu

== Other projects ==
- Wikimedia Commons contains pictures and other files about Puzzone di Moena
