= Murcian cheese =

Spanish fatty cheese made of goat's milk

Murcian cheese (Spanish: queso de Murcia) is a fatty goats' milk cheese from the Murcia region of south-east Spain. It has a Protected Designation of Origin. The cheese is made exclusively using goat's milk of the Murcian breed from registered herds which graze freely on scrub and coarse pasture characteristic of that dry geographical zone. The cheese is made in two forms:

- Fresh – presented in cylindrical cheeses of two sizes: 5–8 centimetres (2–3 in) high and 7–9 cm (3–4 in) diameter weighing about 300 grams (11 oz), and 8–12 cm (3–5 in) high and 12–18 cm (5–7 in) diameter and weighing 1 or 2 kg (2.2 or 4.4 lb).
- Cured – presented in cylinders 7–9 cm (3–4 in) high and 12–18 cm (5–7 in) diameter weighing 1 or 2 kg (2.2 or 4.4 lb).

== Manufacture ==
The goats are milked daily and after filtration the milk is warmed and curdled with an animal enzyme or another authorised agent. Depending on the type of cheese to be produced the process continues thus:

For fresh cheese the milk is curdled at 32–35 °C (90–95 °F) for 30–45 minutes. The curd is then cut to grain of 10 millimetres (0.39 in) and the temperature is raised a further 3–5 °C (5.4–9.0 °F). The curd is then worked a little to make a soft consistency and transferred to moulds. The moulds have an interior pattern of rushes (Sp: plieta) which transfers to the exterior of the fresh cheeses. The cheese is pressed lightly and for short duration and then salted by immersion in brine for 10 hours, drained and kept at a maximum temperature of 4 °C (39 °F) until sold.

For cured cheese the milk is curdled at 30–34 °C (86–93 °F) for 40–60 minutes. The curd is cut to grains of 5 mm (0.20 in) and then the temperature is raised by a further 3–5 °C (5.4–9.0 °F). The curd is then worked quite hard to produce a harder cheese and then placed in plain moulds. It is pressed for 2–4 hours until it has reached the correct pH. The cheeses are then salted in brine for a maximum of 20 hours. Finally they are left to mature for a minimum of sixty days and sometimes much longer.

== Flavour ==
Both the fresh cheese and the cured cheese have a light goat flavour with a slight saltiness and slight acidity, not a complex flavour.

== Texture ==
The fresh cheese is soft but firm to cut, of a very white colour and usually without cavities.

The cured cheese is firm to the cut, has a white to light cream colour and may have very few, small cavities.

== Rind ==
The fresh cheese has almost no rind and is decorated in marks that simulate rushes.

The cured cheese rind is thin, smooth and straw-coloured to light brown.

== Uses ==
Fresh cheese may be grilled or used in cooking desserts or salads. The cured cheese is eaten sliced as a snack with beer or wine, or may be part of a meal.

== See also ==
- List of cheeses
