= Murcian wine cheese =

Fatty goats' milk cheese from the province of Murcia, Spain

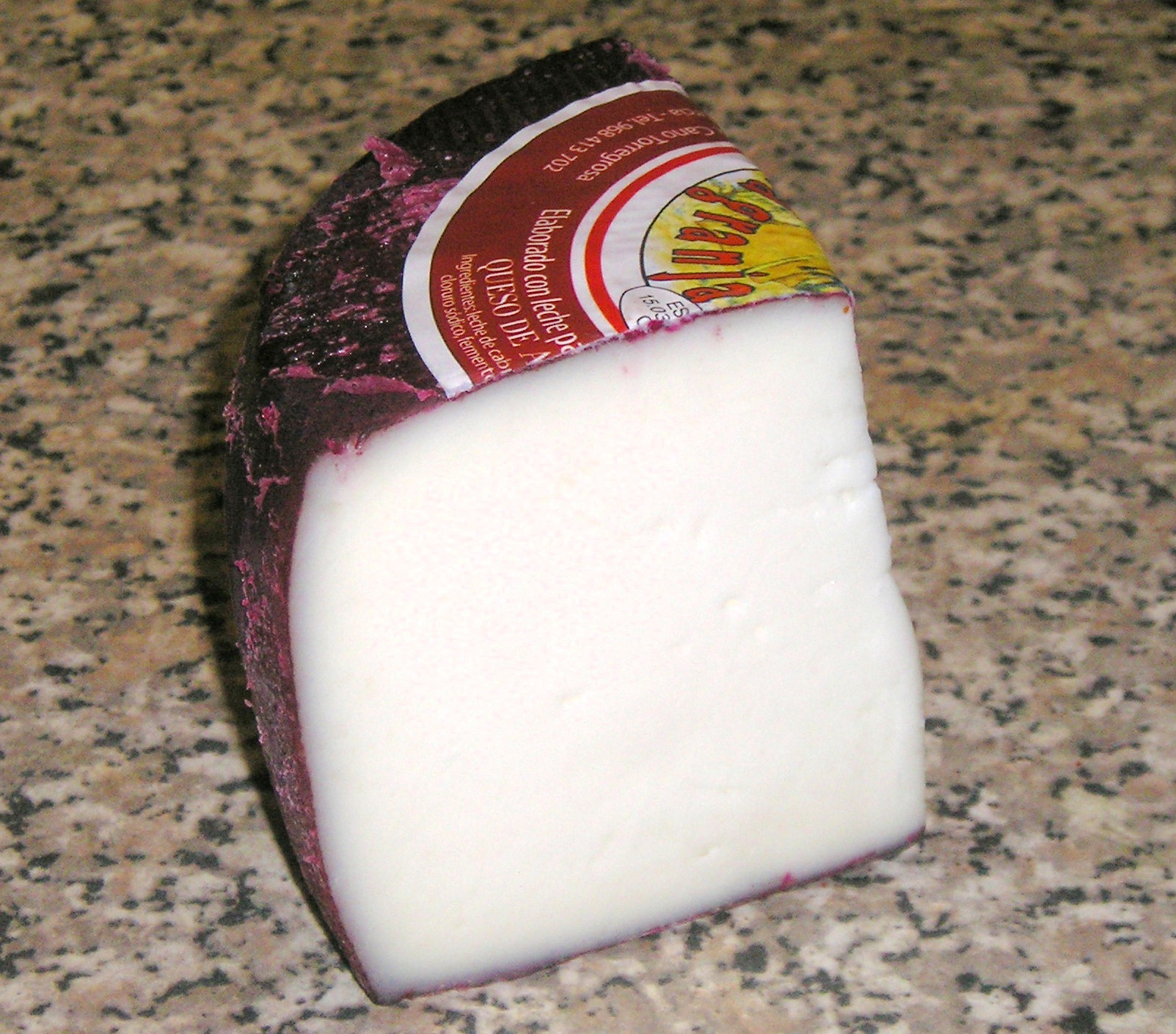
Murcian wine cheese

Murcian wine cheese (Spanish: queso de Murcia al vino) is a fatty goats’ milk cheese from the province of Murcia in the south-east of Spain. It has a Protected Designation of Origin. The cheese is made only from unpasteurized goats’ milk of the Murcian breed from registered herds. The term al vino refers to the washing of the rind with red wine during maturation. The cheese is presented in cylinders 6–7 cm (2.4–2.8 in) high and 7–9 cm (2.8–3.5 in) diameter weighing 400 g (14 ounces), or 7–9 cm (2.8–3.5 in) high and 12–18 cm (4.5–7 in) diameter weighing 1 or 2 kg (2.2 or 4.4 lb).

== Manufacture ==
The goats are milked daily and after filtration the milk is warmed to 30–34 °C (86–93 °F) and curdled with an animal enzyme or another authorised agent. The coagulation lasts from 40 to 60 minutes after which the curd is cut to grains of 6–8 mm (0.24–0.31 in) The curd is then washed and 15% of the whey is removed and replaced with water. The curd is then heated by a further 3–5 °C (37–41 °F) and then worked lightly. The curd is then placed in plain moulds and pressed for 2–4 hours until the appropriate pH is achieved. The cheese is then salted in a brine bath for a maximum of 20 hours. Maturation of the larger cheeses takes a minimum of 45 days, the smaller pieces take a minimum of 30 days, during which the cheeses are immersed several times in a bath of red wine from the region.

== Flavour ==
The cheese has an agreeable creamy flavour, a slight saltiness and a mild aroma. Murcian wine cheese is coloured white to light cream and has a compact and elastic texture. The colour of the red wine baths does not permeate into the cheese. There are a few small cavities throughout the cheese.

== Rind ==
Smooth and thin, it has a purplish-red colour as a consequence of the baths in red wine during maturation. There may be an indented criss-cross geometric pattern on the faces of the cheese.

== Uses ==
As with many harder Spanish cheeses it is eaten sliced as a snack with beer or wine, or else as part of a meal with fruit or nuts.

== See also ==
- List of cheeses – List of cheeses by place of origin
