= Salva (cheese) =

Italian cheese

- Country of origin: Italy
- Region: Lombardy
- Town: Crema
- Source of milk: Cow
- Pasteurized: No
- Dimensions: Triangular shape with 11–19 cm (4.3–7.5 in) long sides and 9–15 cm (3.5–5.9 in) short end
- Weight: 1.3 to 5 kg (2.9 to 11.0 lb)
- Aging time: Usually 3–5 months, although sometimes 8–12 months, and up to 36 months
- Certification: PDO

Salva cheese from Crema is a PDO table cow's milk cheese made with raw curd. It is a washed-rind cheese that undergoes a medium or long aging period.

Salva is traditionally eaten in the central plain of Lombardy and produced particularly in the area of Crema, Bergamo, and Brescia. It is also produced in the provinces of Lecco, Lodi, and Milan. Salva has many similarities to Quartirolo, though differs from it by having longer aging and a major aromatic complexity.

== Origin of the name ==
Salva's name comes from the idea of salvare il latte (lit. 'saving the milk'), which is the tradition of saving the plentiful milk left over from the process of cheesemaking in spring, which is then used to produce Salva cheese. It is also called Salva cremasco (lit. 'Salva from Crema') because of its origin and traditional consumption in Crema, although today it is more often produced elsewhere.

== History ==
Its origins date back to the 17th and 18th centuries, when it becomes possible to identify the parallelepiped profile of Salva on some decorative truckles. These truckles were straw-white in color and had a thin crust and very rare eyes (called occhiature), also associated with modern Salva cheese. Salva is closely connected with the seasonal transhumance that bergamini (shepherds from Bergamo) undertook with their cows, coming down from the valleys of Bergamo and Brescia towards farms in the lowlands in autumn, and returning to the valleys in spring. During these trips the cows produced more milk than could be consumed, particularly in spring, necessitating its transformation into strachì da Salva cheese so that it could be preserved in summer.

== Production ==
Full-cream pasteurized milk is used in Salva production. Its coagulation at 36 °C (97 °F) lasts 30 minutes. The curd is then chopped twice into very small pieces. Finally, the bulky mass is put in a damp location for 8–16 hours. Aging lasts either 3–5 months (in this case the product has an aromatic and fragrant flavour), or 8–12 months. There are rare truckles aged up to 36 months. Sometimes the crust is flavoured with pomace. Salva truckles have a parallelepiped shape with a plain squared side 11–13 cm (4.3–5.1 in) or 17–19 cm (6.7–7.5 in) long, and a straight bowed side 9–15 cm (3.5–5.9 in) long. The average truckle weighs 1.3 to 5 kg (2.9 to 11.0 lb). The crust is washed with water and salt. Cheeses aged for a longer time are oiled. In the past, linseed oil was used for this purpose. In this way some yellow mildew builds up, penetrating the crust and increasing the flavour. The cheeses are typically branded with the capital letters S and C.

On 21 November 2002, the consortium for the safeguard of the Salva Cremasco was established, and Salva was granted protected designation of origin status due to its uniqueness and traditional method of production.

== Uses ==
=== Salva and tighe ===
The most typical preparation of Salva in the Crema area is Salva con le tighe (Salva with pickled green Lombard peppers). The Salva is cut in little cubes and served with tighe cut into large strips without seeds, and a small amount of olive oil. The combination is left to rest before consumption according to taste; it is thought too much oil makes the cheese macerate.

=== Other preparations ===
Salva can be used in a variety of dishes from starters to desserts, and from first to second courses.

== See also ==
- List of Italian cheeses

== Bibliography ==
- Mangià Nustrà, a cura di Daniela Bianchessi e Roberta Schira, Grafin, s.d.
- Ricettario tradizionale di Cremona, Crema, Casalmaggiore, a cura di Marta Bergamaschi, Umberto Soncini Editore.
- Sapori cremaschi, ricette dalla cucina di Crema, raccolte da Marzia Ermentini.
- Ricette da salvare, a cura di Consorzio Tutela Salva Cremasco.
