= Caciotta =

Italian cheese

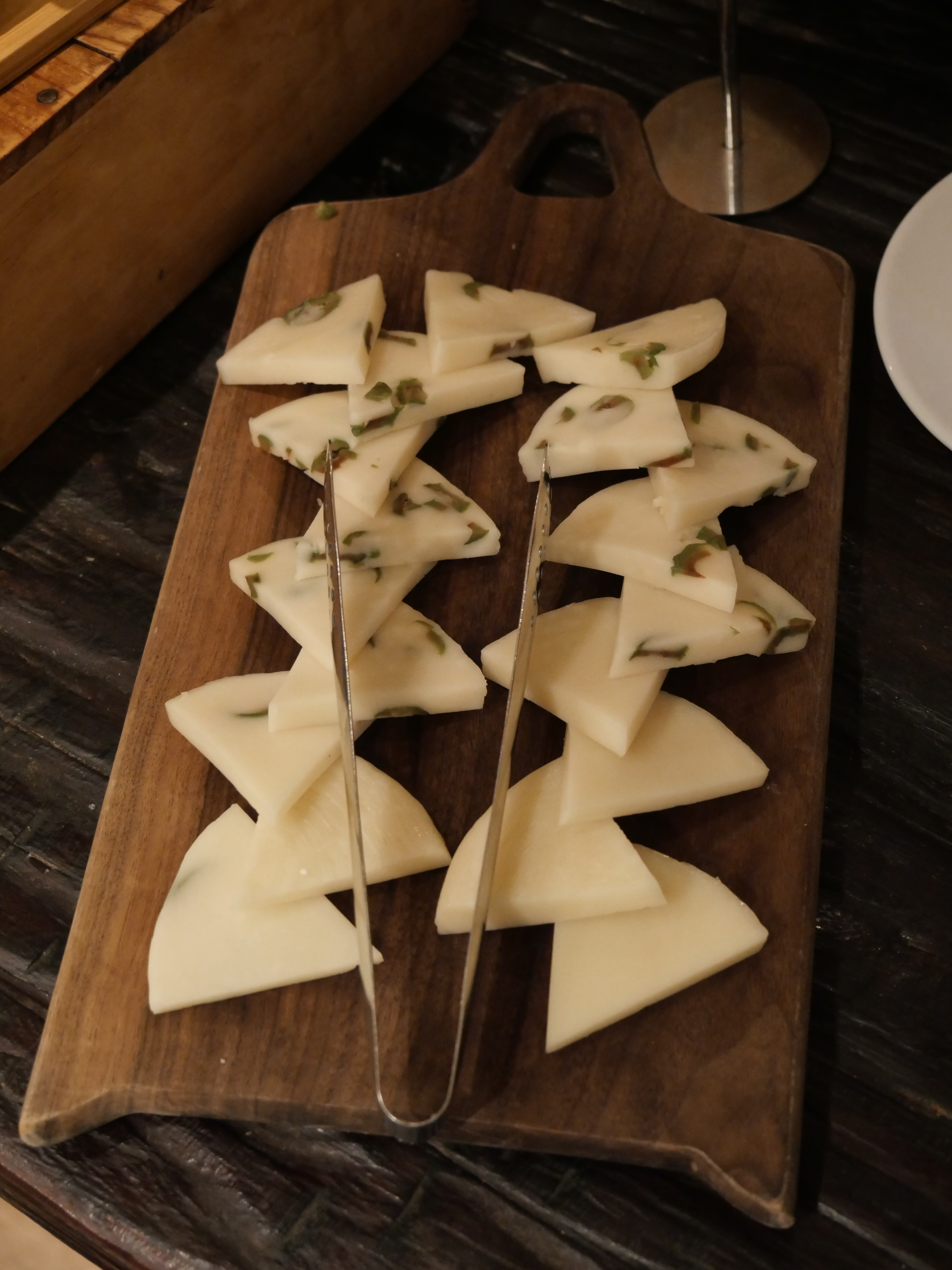
Caciotta

Caciotta, from the Tuscan cacciola, is a type of cheese produced in Italy from the milk of cows, sheep, goats, or water buffalo. Caciotta has more than a dozen variations.

The cheeses are cylindrical in shape and up to 1 kilogram (2.2 lb) in weight. The period of ripening is brief and the soft, yellow rind surrounds a white or yellowish body which is soft in texture and mild in flavour. Both artisanal and industrial production are common.

== See also ==
- List of Italian cheeses
