= Casciotta d'Urbino =

Italian cheese

Casciotta d'Urbino DOP
- Country of origin: Italy
- Region: Marche
- Town: Urbino
- Source of milk: Cow and sheep
- Pasteurised: Often
- Texture: Semi-soft and crumbly
- Weight: 800g–1.2 kg
- Aging time: Typically 2 weeks to 1 month
- Certification: D.O.: 1982; DOP: 12 June 1996

Casciotta d'Urbino or Casciotta di Urbino is a type of caciotta cheese made in the province of Pesaro and Urbino, in the Marche region of Italy.

This cheese is generally made of between 70 and 80% sheep's milk with 20–30% cow's milk.

Local legend has it that the name came about from a mis-pronunciation of "caciotta" by a local civil servant, some say it is derived from the local dialect.

== See also ==
- List of Italian cheeses
