= Pecorino toscano =

Italian cheese

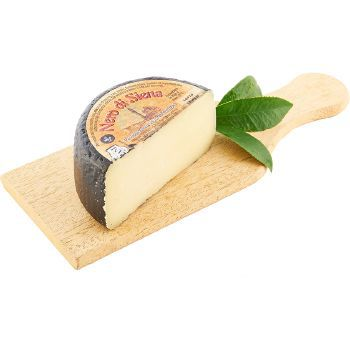
- Country of origin: Italy
- Region: Tuscany
- Source of milk: Sheep milk
- Pasteurised: Yes
- Certification: PDO: 1996

Pecorino toscano (lit. 'Tuscan pecorino') is a firm sheep milk cheese from Tuscany. Since 1996 it has enjoyed protected designation of origin (PDO) status.

== History ==
Pliny the Elder, in his major encyclopaedic work Naturalis Historia, describes several stages in the production of pecorino toscano, which he names as Lunense, apparently after the territory of Lunigiana. Other early names of the cheese include marzolino, after the month of March (marzo in Italian) in which production traditionally began.

In 1475 the writer Bartolomeo Platina said that the Etruscan marzolino was as good as Parmesan cheese: "In Italy there are two types of cheese that compete for the first place: marzolino, so called by the Etruscans because it is made in Etruria in March, and Parmesan cheese, from the Cisalpine region, that is also known as maggengo, because it is produced in May (maggio in Italian)."

Today, this style of pecorino is widely produced across Tuscany and also in several nearer districts of Umbria and Lazio regions.

== Production ==
According to a 1997 estimate by the Italian dairy producers' association, Assolatte, annual production of pecorino toscano was 5,060 metric tons (4,980 long tons; 5,580 short tons). This ranks the cheese as the third-highest sheep's cheese in Italy, the largest being pecorino romano (28,366 metric tons, 27,918 long tons, 31,268 short tons) and pecorino sardo (12,000 metric tons, 12,000 long tons, 13,000 short tons).

== See also ==
Media related to Pecorino toscano at Wikimedia Commons

- List of Italian cheeses
- List of Italian DOP cheeses – food with protected designation of origin status
- Pecorino – hard Italian sheep's milk cheese
