= Brousse du Rove =

Goat milk cheese, made in France

Brousse du Rove (Provençal: Brossa dau Rove) is a type of goat cheese, made in the commune of Le Rove in the Bouches-du-Rhône region of France.

== History ==
A dossier was submitted by eight breeders in the spring of 2007, promoting the product.

Some industrialists and craftsmen promoted other products that did not require the hard work and quality of feeding of Rove livestock (mainly agro-pastoralism on the Rove and Étoile ranges).

On 31 May 2018, Brousse du Rove received an Appellation d'origine contrôlée, The book Balade au pays des fromages : Les traditions fromagères en France by Jean Froc, states:

In the Bouches-du-Rhône region, this recuite, from the Rove goat breed, is called brousse du Rove. It has been noticed since at least the beginning of the 19th century. Nowadays, this brousse, still rare and sought-after in Marseille and the surrounding region, has changed: it's made either with the milk of the Rove goats, or with cow's milk; in any case, it's milk rather than whey. Nevertheless, it is still eaten sweetened, drizzled with orange blossom water, or used as a base for an egg cake.

== Production ==
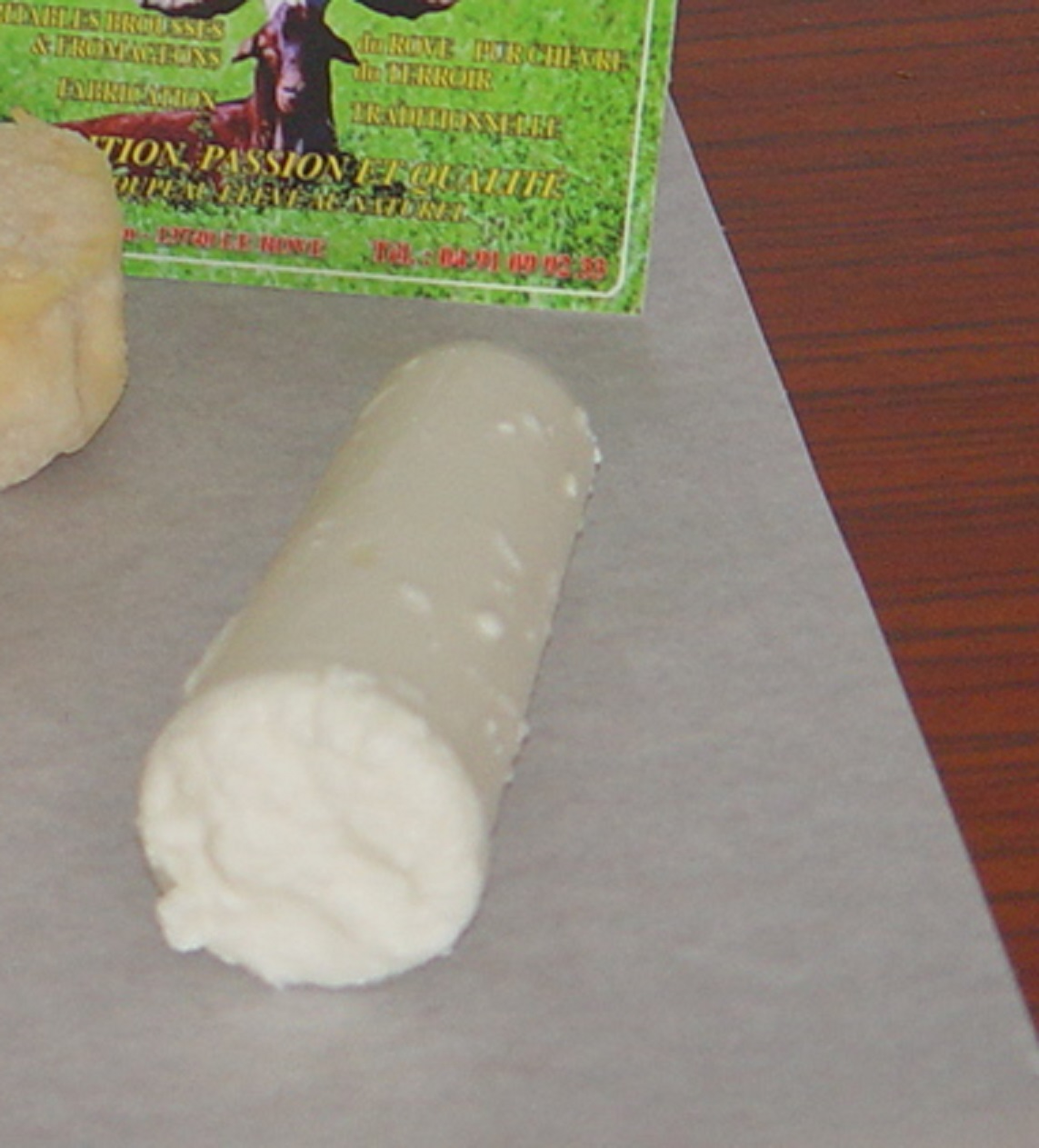

The Rove bush (AOC and AOP) is a farm production-only cheese. It is based on whole goat's milk of the breed Rove and not with whey, unlike the other brousses which are whey cheeses. The Rove bush is therefore a whey cheese in the French sense.

The goats of Rove live in agropastoralism on the scrublands of Rove, l'Étoile, and other massifs surrounding Marseille. Shepherds and their goats and dogs practice their craft around Nerthe, Septeme, Simiane, Mimet, etc. Their diet must balance grass, broom and gorse (argelas Genista scorpius) and other plants or shrubs (kermes oak Quercus coccifera) of this scrubland, complemented by aromas of thyme, rosemary, and others such as Helichrysum italicum. They return to the farm for milking each afternoon.

In the commune of Rove, milking is done by hand, at the Vérune stable. Immediately after milking, the milk is gradually raised in temperature to ~90 °C (194 °F) (pasteurizing it). It is left to cool to ~70 °C (158 °F) , then the breeder-cheese maker adds spirit vinegar. The lumps are collected with a skimmer and molded into elongated conical shapes of 12 centimetres (4.7 in) in length. The yields and effluents of these cheeses are comparable with those of other cheese and other whey cheeses.

In the center of the pastures, part of which overlooks the Berre pond and the other the Rade de Marseille. The farm is family-run and centuries old, unlike that of Septême whose owner sold to a municipal goat farm whose operator employs a hired shepherd. In addition to heritage, the other desired goal is the maintenance of open landscape, particularly in the context of fire prevention/management.

The milk of these goats is an extraordinary 45g/l.

The elongated cylindrical faisselles are reminiscent of the tradition that would have them served in ram's horns which gave way to tin and then plastic cones. It is also found in "baskets".

== Consumption ==
Brousse du Rove is served in many fine restaurants in and around Marseille, in a wide variety of preparations. Traditionally, it is served in cones, with coulis or other accompaniments, or by itself.
