= Red pecorino =

Sicilian red sheep's milk cheese

Red pecorino is a red Sicilian cheese which was originally developed in Sicily, Italy. In Italian, it is referred to as "picurinu rusu". Red pecorino is made from sheep's milk and Sicilian folate pastes in a technique known as pasta filata which is used in the manufacture of a family of Italian cheeses also known as stretched-curd, pulled-curd, and plastic-curd.

The production of red pecorino is officially recognized and included in the list of food products of traditional Italian cuisine (A.P.T), the Ministry of Agriculture, Food and Forestry. In Italian regions such as Tuscany and Sardinia, other cheeses are called by their original name. The red Sicilian pecorino however, is referred to as seasoning. Red pecorino is made from tomato sauce and plain sheep's milk. Saffron or chili pepper are added during production.

== Features ==
Red Pecorino takes its name from its unique method of preparation. After being rubbed with seasoning and olive oil, the cheese is stained with tomato sauce, providing its signature red color. The cheese itself is processed manually, starting with the formation process, which occurs when the cheese is about two months old and still tender and fresh. The olive oil and tomato sauce are mixed together and applied as a protective layer over the cheese. It is in this state that the cheese matures.
