= Valle d'Aosta Fromadzo =

Italian cheese

Valle d'Aosta Fromadzo Vallée d'Aoste Fromadzo
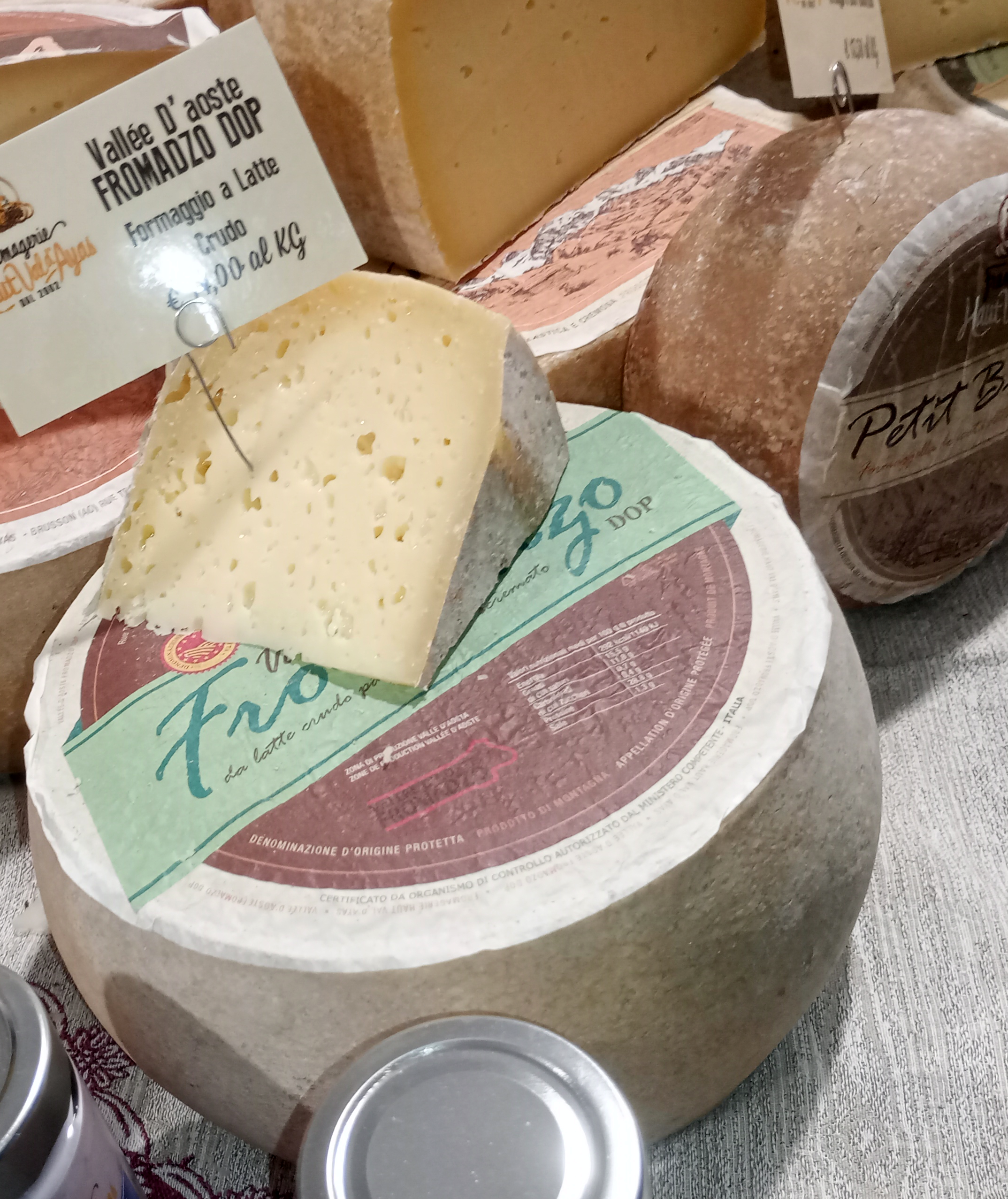
- Country of origin: Italy
- Region: Aosta Valley
- Source of milk: Cows
- Certification: PDO 1995

Valle d'Aosta Fromadzo or Vallée d'Aoste Fromadzo is an Italian cow's milk cheese produced in the Aosta Valley, one of the region's specialties. It has a protected designation of origin, or PDO status.
