= Pecorino di Filiano =

Italian cheese

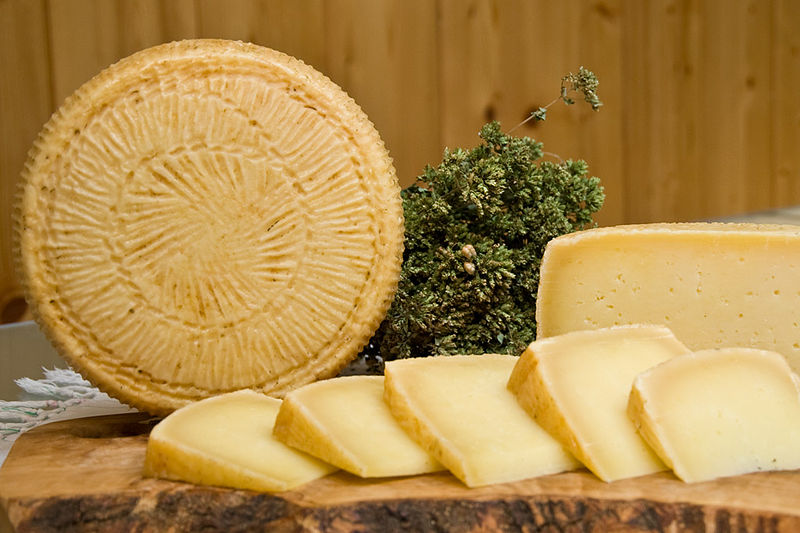
- Country of origin: Italy
- Region: Basilicata (province of Potenza)
- Source of milk: Sheep milk
- Pasteurised: No
- Texture: Hard
- Aging time: Minimum 180 days
- Certification: PDO: 2007

Pecorino di Filiano is a firm sheep milk cheese from Basilicata, produced in the province of Potenza. It was granted protected designation of origin (PDO) in 2007.

Every year on the first Sunday of September in Filiano is organized the pecorino di Filiano festival, where the cheese, produced by various farmers, is available to taste and buy.

== See also ==
- List of Italian cheeses
- List of Italian DOP cheeses – food with protected designation of origin status
- Pecorino – hard Italian sheep's milk cheese
