= Squacquerone =

Italian cheese

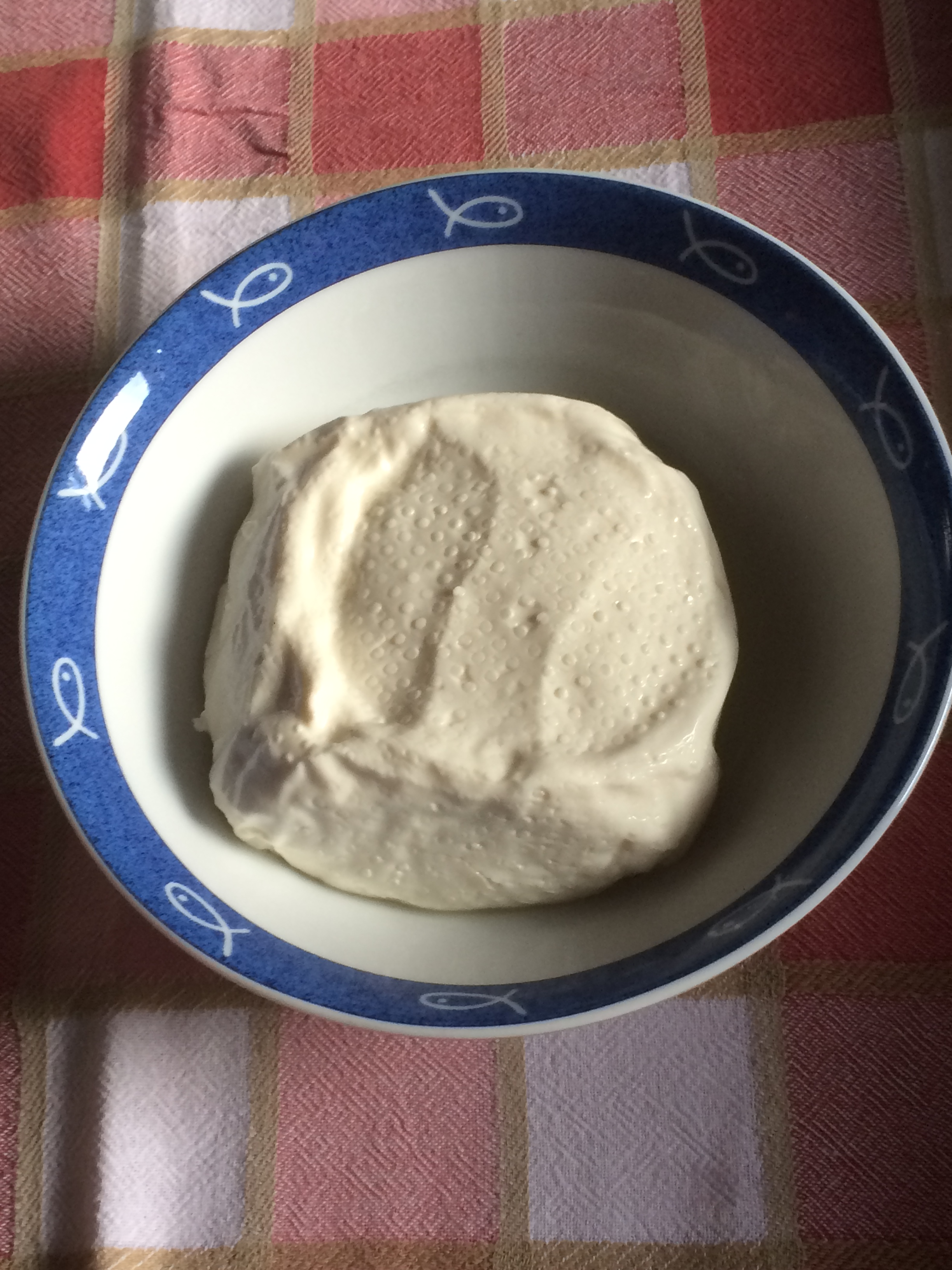
- Squacquerone cheese
- Country of origin: Italy
- Region: Emilia-Romagna
- Source of milk: Cow
- Texture: Soft and crumbly
- Certification: Protected designation of origin (PDO)

Squacquerone is an Italian cheese soft and crumbly type, originally from Romagna.

== Description ==
Squacquerone is a cow's milk cheese, made from whole milk, with a very short maturation. It is similar to crescenza, although the paste (white in color) is less consistent due to the high water content. It is made of pasteurized or raw milk, and is extremely soft, creamy, and spreadable. The color is ivory white and the taste notes are typically lactic, with a sweet-sour taste. It is one of the main products with which piadina is stuffed.

In addition to the common squacquerone, the Squacquerone di Romagna PDO is widespread, produced only in the designated area and in compliance with the relative regulations.

== Etymology ==
The etymology, of Romagna origin, refers to the consistency that squaglia ("melts") due to the high presence of water.

== See also ==
- List of Italian cheeses
