= Spressa delle Giudicarie =

Italian cheese

- Country of origin: Italy
- Source of milk: Cows
- Certification: PDO 2003

Spressa delle Giudicarie is an Italian cheese that comes from the region of Trentino-Alto Adige/Südtirol. The Spressa delle Giudicarie can be consumed fresh after three months, while curing takes more than six months. The cheese is made in cylindrical shape, about 25 cm (9.8 in) in diameter. The crust is brown, the interior of the cheese is white to very pale yellow with small to medium-sized holes. The cheese is eaten when still young. It is a cow's milk cheese Rendena race mostly, from two milkings, the evening and the morning.

Originally, the milk was used to make butter. The skimmed milk that remained was used for cheeses.

It pairs well with local wine, as Marzemino, red wine DOC from southern Trentino.

== See also ==
- List of cheeses
