= Bra cheese =

Italian cheese

Bra
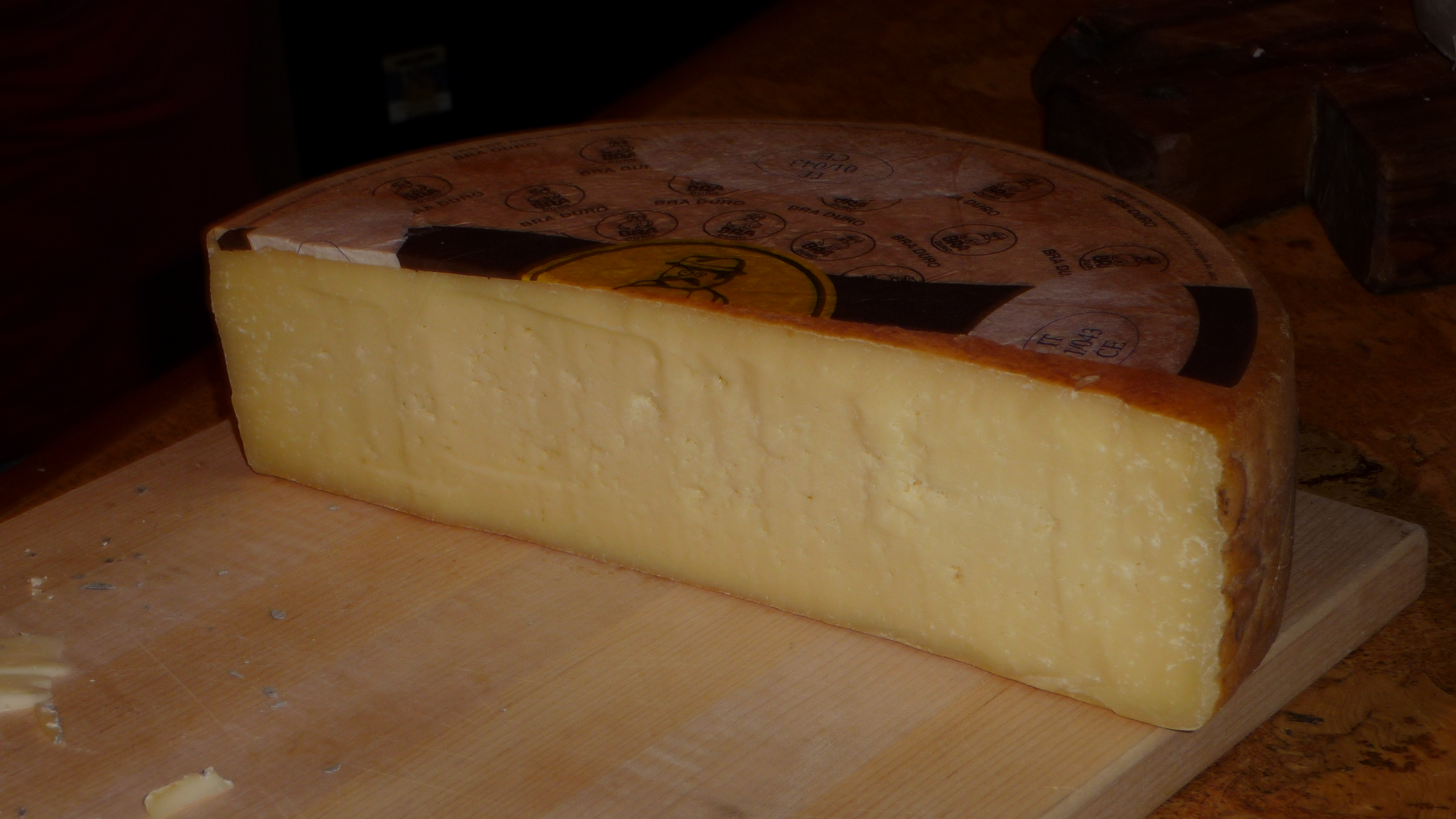
- Bra Duro DOP
- Country of origin: Italy
- Region: Piedmont
- Certification: PDO

The Italian cheese Bra originates from the town of Bra, in province of Cuneo, in the region of Piedmont.

Production of Bra may take place all year, but it may only legally take place within the province of Cuneo. However, aging may also take place in Villafranca, in province of Turin.

The cheese may use either unpasteurized or pasteurized milk, often entirely cow's milk, but goat's or sheep's milk may be added in small amounts. It may be served as a soft or hard cheese, depending on the length of aging, from at least 45 days for soft cheese, to six months for hard cheese.

Bra has PDO status under European Union law.
