= Pecorino siciliano =

Italian cheese

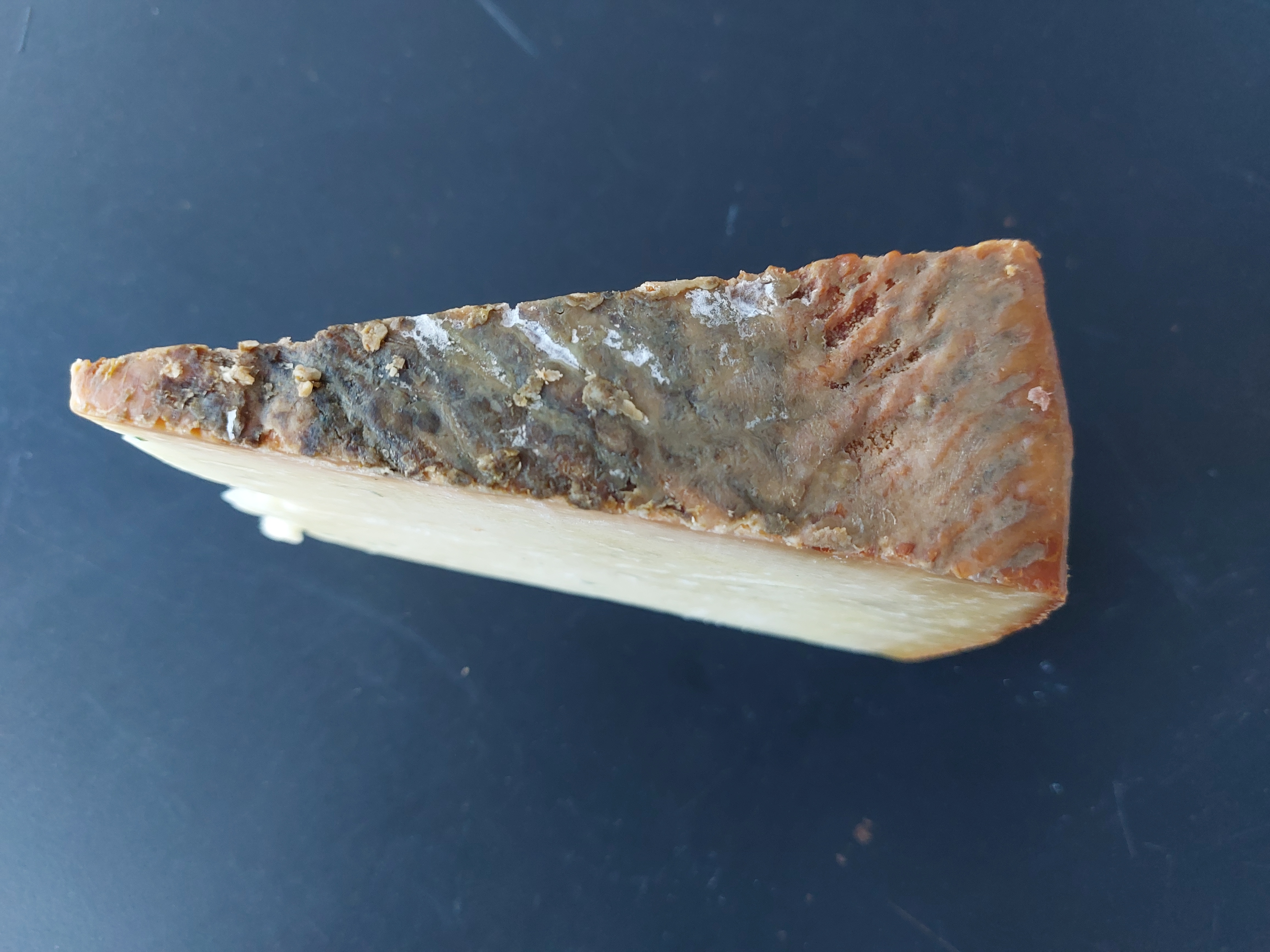
- Country of origin: Italy
- Region: Sicily
- Source of milk: Sheep milk
- Certification: DOC: 1955; PDO: 1996

Pecorino siciliano (Sicilian: picurinu sicilianu; lit. 'Sicilian pecorino') is a firm sheep milk cheese from Sicily. This cheese comes from the classical Greek world: in ancient times it was recognized as one of the best cheeses in the world.

It is produced throughout the island, but especially in the provinces of Agrigento, Caltanissetta, Enna, Trapani, and Palermo. It is a pecorino-style cheese, like its close relation pecorino romano, but not as well known outside Italy as the latter. A semi-hard white cheese, it has a cylindrical shape and a weight of about 12 kg (26 lb).

The cheese was awarded with the denominazione di origine controllata (DOC) status in 1955 and the European Union protected designation of origin (PDO) status in 1996.

It is used in many traditional dishes with the most popular one the Pesto alla Trapanese.

== See also ==
- List of Italian cheeses
- List of Italian DOP cheeses – food with protected designation of origin status
- Pecorino – hard Italian sheep's milk cheese
