= Vastedda =

Traditional Sicilian bread

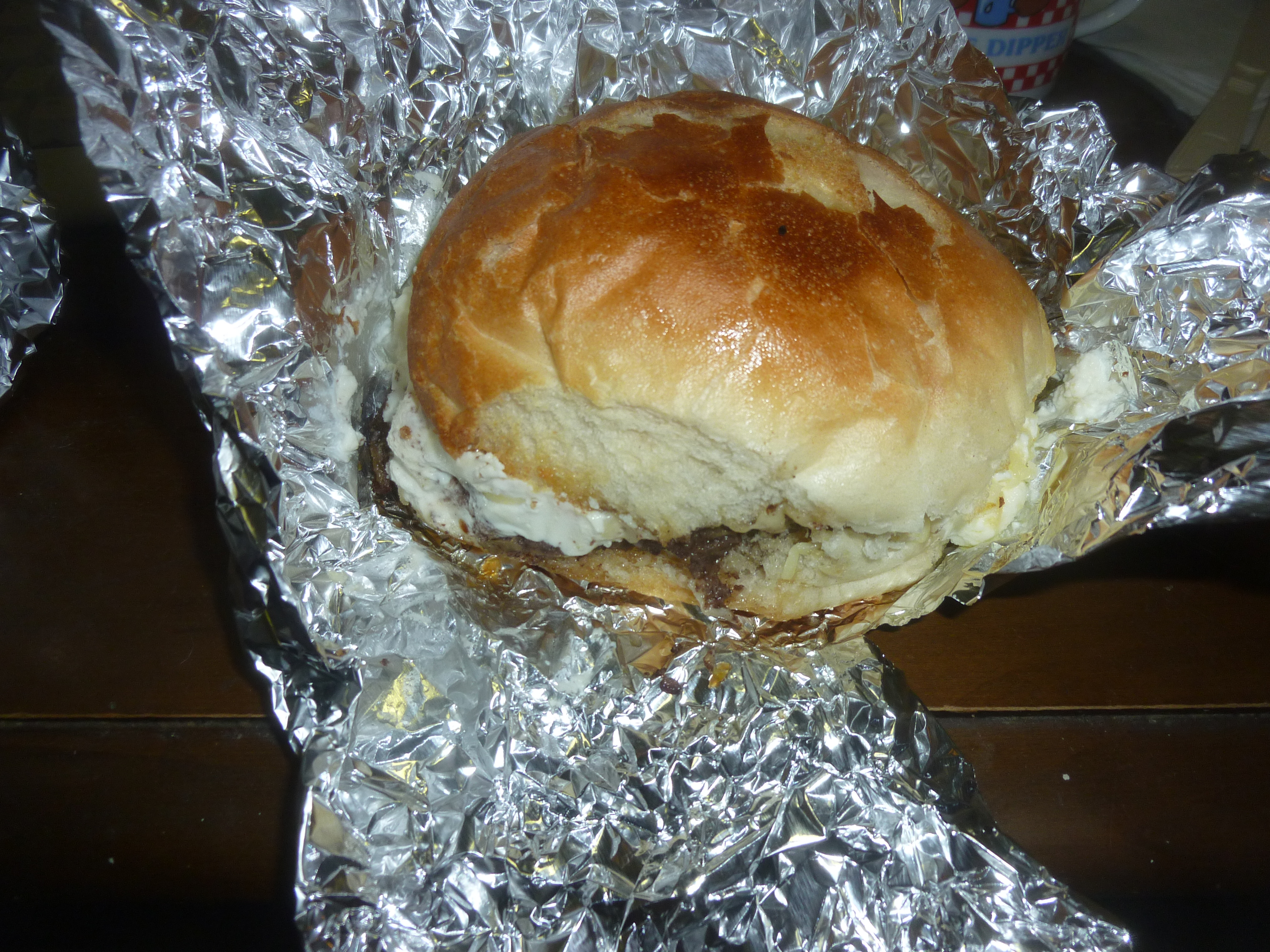
- Place of origin: Italy
- Region or state: Sicily

Vastedda (Sicilian: [vaˈstɛɖːa, vaˈʃtɛɖːa]) is the traditional Sicilian bread used to prepare the pani câ meusa, a sandwich of veal spleen. It often also includes caciocavallo and ricotta toppings. Vastedda is most common in the city of Palermo.

In Gratteri, near Palermo, a fried version called vastedda fritta is also prepared. The vastedda fritta is recognized by the Italian Ministry of Agricultural, Food and Forestry as a prodotto agroalimentare tradizionale (PAT) and is listed on the official list of traditional Italian agricultural and food products.

== Sicilian cheese ==
The term vastedda or vastella in Sicilian indicates also different traditional types of cheese such as Vastedda della Valle del Belice and Vastedda Palermitana, which are listed as prodotti agroalimentari tradizionali by the Italian Ministry of Agricultural, Food and Forestry.

== See also ==
- Pani câ meusa
