= Quartirolo lombardo =

Italian cheese

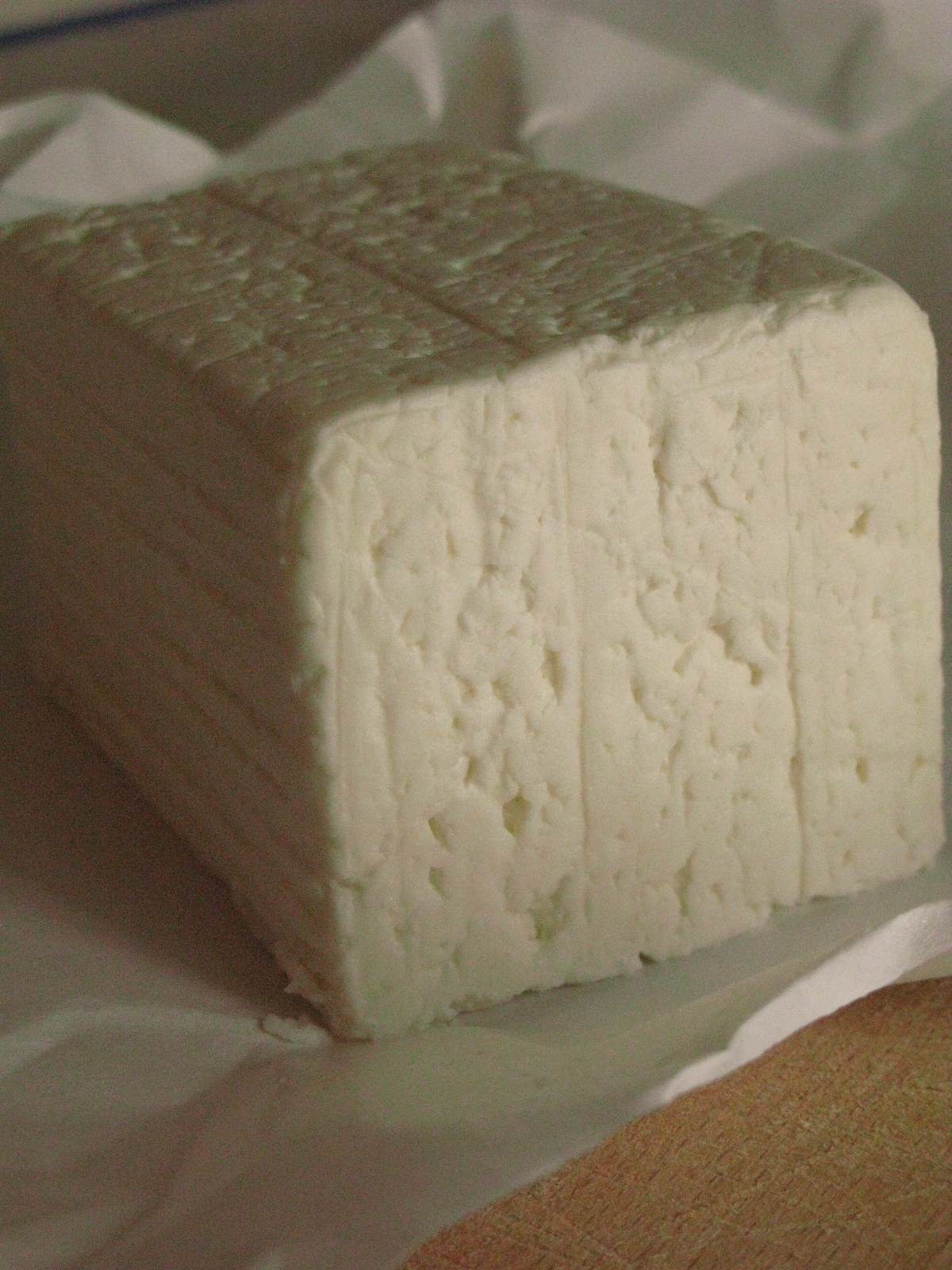
- Country of origin: Italy
- Region: Lombardy
- Town: Provinces of Bergamo, Brescia, Como, Cremona, Lecco, Lodi, Milano, Monza, Pavia, Varese
- Source of milk: Cows
- Certification: PDO

Quartirolo lombardo (Lombard: quartiroeul lombard) is a soft cheese made with cow's milk, which has a protected designation of origin (PDO) status.

== History ==
The beginning of its production dates back to the 10th century. Its production was seasonal, the cheese was made at the end of the summer with the milk of cows that had eaten erba quartirola, that is the grass that had grown again after the third cut.

Nowadays, it is made all year around, it has been recognised by the European Economic Community and registered in the PDP list with ECC Reg. n. 1107/96.

== Production area ==
The milk source area, the cheese production area and cheese ripening area of quartirolo lombardo consist of the country of the provinces of Bergamo, Brescia, Como, Cremona, Lecco, Lodi, Milan, Monza, Pavia, and Varese.

== Description ==
The shape is a rectangular parallelepiped with the straight cheese side. The weight of a cheese wheel may span from 1.5 kg (3.3 lb) to 3.5 kg (7.7 lb). The rind is thin and soft, white pinky in cheese at first ageing and grey-green reddish in the one more aged. The curd texture is cohesive, slightly gummy, possibly with few detachments, crumbly and it becomes more compact and soft as the ageing goes on.

The colour goes from white to straw-white, it can become more intense in the aged cheese.

The flavour is distinctive, slightly sour—aromatic in the cheese at the first ageing and more aromatic in the one at full ageing. The fat in the dry material is not less than 30% for the product obtained from semi-skimmed milk.

== Production process ==
Quartirolo is produced with whole or semi-skimmed cow's milk coming from two or more milking. Coagulation is made with veal's rennet at temperature near 35 °C (95 °F) – 40 °C (104 °F) in 25 minutes. Adding of a milk starter culture is allowed, done exclusively at the same cheese factory where the milk is worked.

The breaking of the curd is done at two separate times and controlled by the acid evolution of the whey. At the end of the second breaking, the clumps are the size of a hazelnut. The diary mass, mixed with whey, is put in moulds and then stewed at 26 °C (79 °F) – 28 °C (82 °F) for 4 to 24 hours. Salting is done dry or in a brine bath.

Cheese ripening takes place in suitable cells, at a temperature of 2 °C (36 °F) – 8 °C (46 °F) and at a relative humidity of 85–90%; the ageing time last from 5 to 30 days for the kind with soft curd, later than 30 days the product is sold as aged quartirolo lombardo.

No treatment of the rind is allowed.

== Nutritional value ==
Quartirolo lombardo
Nutritional value per 100 g (3.5 oz)
- Energy: 1,240 kJ (300 kcal)
- Carbohydrates: 0 g
- Fat: 24.5 g
- Protein: 18,5 g
Vitamins and minerals
Vitamins	Quantity %DV^{†}
Vitamin A equiv.	37% 336 μg
Riboflavin (B2)	17% 0.220 mg
Minerals	Quantity %DV^{†}
Calcium	44% 572 mg
Magnesium	5% 21.8 mg
- ^{†}Percentages estimated using US recommendations for adults.

== See also ==
- Lombard cuisine
