= Skimmed milk =

Milk from which milkfat has been removed

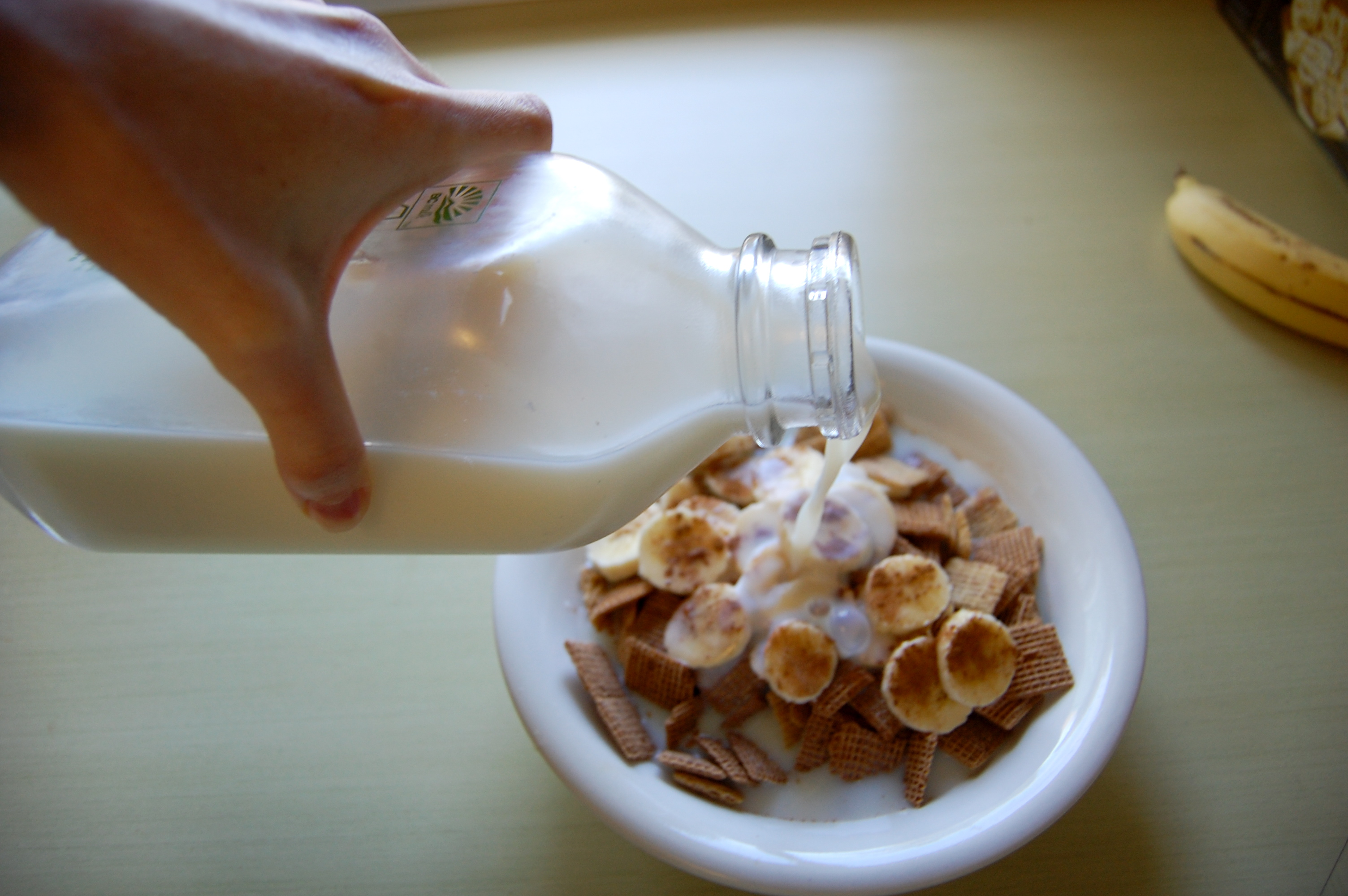
Skimmed milk being poured into a cereal bowl

Skimmed milk (British English), or skim milk (American English), is made when all the milkfat is removed from whole milk. It tends to contain around 0.1% to 0.3% fat.

== Background ==
Historically, skimmed milk was used for fattening pigs, and was recommended as "not only the very best supplement for growing pigs, but is of almost equal value for fattening purposes" as it "furnishes a complete protein" and makes the feed "more palatable".

== Terminology ==
In the United Kingdom, milk has been traditionally marketed and labelled as follows since being proposed by John Morris of the British Retail Consortium in 1998, which based the colours on Marks & Spencer cream packaging (blue for double cream, green for crème fraîche and red for single cream):

- Whole milk (around 3–4% fat) – Plastic bottles marketed in blue packaging.
- Semi-skimmed milk (around 1.8% fat) – Plastic bottles are marketed in green packaging.
- Skimmed milk (around 0.1% fat) – Plastic bottles are marketed in red packaging.
- Channel Island milk (around 5–5.5% fat) Often referred to as gold top, although this varies.

In the UK, milk is sometimes still delivered on the doorsteps by a milkman in the early hours of the morning in glass pint bottles with the colour printed foil lid indicating the milkfat content. Whole milk had plain silver foil, semi-skimmed milk had silver foil with red stripes and skimmed milk silver foil with a blue checker pattern.

In the United States, milk is marketed primarily by fat content and available in these varieties:

- Whole milk is 3.5% fat
- 2% Reduced-fat milk
- 1% Lowfat milk
- 0% Non-fat milk (also called skim milk or fat-free milk)

United States milk producers also use a color-coding system to identify milk types, usually with the bottle cap or colored accents on the packaging. Whole milk is often denoted by red, while 2% is most often colored blue. 1% and skim colors vary by region or dairy, with common colors for these lines being purple, green, yellow, pink, or light blue.

== Production ==
Most skimmed milk is created by spinning whole milk in a centrifuge so that the fat droplets separate out.

== See also ==
- Fat content of milk
