= Pecorino sardo =

Italian firm sheep's milk cheese

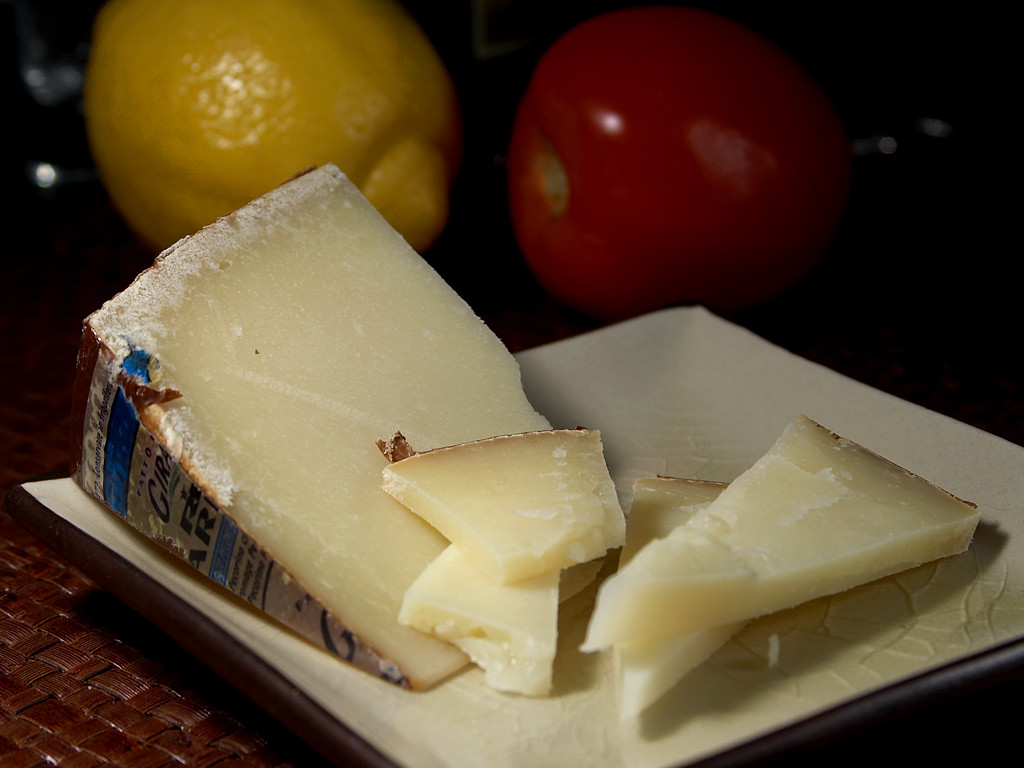
- Other names: Fiore sardo
- Country of origin: Italy
- Region: Sardinia
- Source of milk: Sheep milk
- Texture: Hard
- Certification: DO: 1991; PDO: 1996

Pecorino sardo (Sardinian: berveghinu sardu; lit. 'Sardinian pecorino') is a firm cheese from Sardinia made from sheep milk, specifically from the milk of the local Sarda sheep. It was awarded denominazione d'origine (DO) status in 1991 and granted protected designation of origin (PDO) protection in 1996, the year in which this European Union certification scheme was introduced. There are two varieties: pecorino sardo dolce, aged for 20–60 days; and pecorino sardo maturo, which is aged more than 2 months.

Pecorino sardo is an uncooked hard cheese, made from fresh whole sheep's milk curdled using calf's rennet. The mixture is salted and poured into moulds. The dolce weights 1.0–2.3 kilograms, while the maturo weighs 1.7–4.0 kilograms. The rind varies from deep yellow to dark brown in colour and encases a paste that varies from white to straw-yellow. The sharpness of the flavour depends on the length of maturation.

== See also ==
Media related to Pecorino sardo at Wikimedia Commons

- List of Italian cheeses
- List of Italian DOP cheeses – food with protected designation of origin status
- Sardo – grating cow's milk cheese, an Argentine cheese
- Pecorino – hard Italian sheep's milk cheese
