= List of Italian food and drink products with protected status =

This is a list of Italian EU protected geographical indications as defined in the Council of the European Union Regulation CE 510/2006, which fall into three schemes.

- 138 Italian products have protected designation of origin (PDO) or DOP (denominazione origine protetta)
- 83 Italian products have protected geographical indication (PGI) or IGP (indicazione geografica protetta)
- 4 Italian products are traditional speciality guaranteed (TSG). They are: mozzarella and pizza napoletana, amatriciana tradizionale, and vincisgrassi alla maceratese

To which they must be added:

- 39 Italian products have geographical indication (GI) or IG (indicazione geografica)

== PDO, PGI, TSG ==
Italian products with PDO (Italian: D.O.P.) and PGI (Italian: I.G.P.) protections
No.	Product	Cat.	Type of product	File number EEC/EC/EU	Date GUCE/GUUE	Region	Province
1	Abbacchio Romano	PGI	Fresh meat (and offal)	Reg. CE n. 507 of 15.06.09	GUCE L. 151 of 16.06.09	Lazio	Rome, Frosinone, Viterbo, Latina, Rieti
2	Acciughe sotto sale del Mar Ligure	PGI	Fresh fish, molluscs, and crustaceans and products derived therefrom	Reg. CE n. 776 of 04.08.08	GUCE L. 207 of 06.08.08	Liguria	Genoa, Imperia, Savona, La Spezia
3	Aceto Balsamico di Modena	PGI	Other products	Reg. CE n. 583 of 03.07.09	GUCE L. 175 of 05.07.09	Emilia-Romagna	Modena, Reggio Emilia
4	Aceto Balsamico Tradizionale di Modena	PDO	Other products	Reg. CE n. 813 of 17.04.00	GUCE L. 100 of 20.04.00	Emilia-Romagna	Modena
5	Aceto Balsamico Tradizionale di Reggio Emilia	PDO	Other products	Reg. CE n. 813 of 17.04.00	GUCE L. 100 of 20.04.00	Emilia-Romagna	Reggio Emilia
6	Aglio Bianco Polesano	PDO	Fruit, vegetables and cereals fresh or processed	Reg. CE n. 1175 of 30.11.09	GUCE L. 314 of 01.12.09	Veneto	Rovigo
7	Aglio di Voghiera	PDO	Fruit, vegetables and cereals fresh or processed	Reg. UE n. 442 of 21.05.10	GUUE L. 126 of 22.05.10	Emilia-Romagna	Ferrara
8	Agnello di Sardegna	IGP	Fresh meat (and offal)	Reg. CE n. 138 of 24.01.01	GUCE L. 23 of 25.01.01	Sardinia	Cagliari, Nuoro, Oristano, Sassari, Carbonia-Iglesias, Medio Campidano, Ogliastra, Olbia Tempio
9	Alto Crotonese	PDO	Oils	Reg. CE n. 1257 of 15.07.03	GUCE L. 177 of 16.07.03	Calabria	Crotone
10	Amarene Brusche di Modena	PGI	Fruit, vegetables and cereals fresh or processed	Reg. CE n. 1028 of 29.10.09	GUCE L. 283 of 30.10.09	Emilia-Romagna	Modena, Bologna
11	Aprutino Pescarese	PDO	Oils	Reg. CE n. 1263 of 01.07.96	GUCE L. 163 of 02.07.96	Abruzzo	Pescara
12	Arancia of Gargano	PGI	Fruit, vegetables and cereals fresh or processed	Reg. CE n. 1017 of 30.08.07	GUCE L. 227 of 31.08.07	Apulia	Foggia
13	Arancia di Ribera	PDO	Fruit, vegetables and cereals fresh or processed	Reg. UE n. 95 of 03.02.11	GUUE L. 30 of 04.02.11	Sicily	Agrigento, Palermo
14	Arancia Rossa di Sicilia	PGI	Fruit, vegetables and cereals fresh or processed	Reg. CE n. 1107 of 12.06.96	GUCE L. 148 of 21.06.96	Sicily	Catania, Syracuse, Enna
15	Asiago	PDO	Cheeses	Reg. CE n. 1107 of 12.06.96, Reg. CE n. 1200 of 15.10.07	GUCE L. 148 of 21.06.96, GUCE L. 271 of 16.10.07	Trentino, Veneto	Trento, Vicenza, Padua, Treviso
16	Asparago Bianco di Bassano	PDO	Fruit, vegetables and cereals fresh or processed	Reg. CE n. 1050 of 12.09.07	GUCE L. 240 of 13.09.07	Veneto	Vicenza
17	Asparago Bianco di Cimadolmo	PGI	Fruit, vegetables and cereals fresh or processed	Reg. CE n. 245 of 08.02.02	GUCE L. 39 of 09.02.02	Veneto	Treviso
18	Asparago di Badoere	PGI	Fruit, vegetables and cereals fresh or processed	Reg. UE n. 923 of 14.10.10	GUUE L. 271 of 15.10.10	Veneto	Padua, Treviso, Venice
19	Asparago verde di Altedo	PGI	Fruit, vegetables and cereals fresh or processed	Reg. CE n. 492 of 18.03.03	GUCE L. 73 of 19.03.03	Emilia-Romagna	Bologna, Ferrara
20	Basilico Genovese	PDO	Fruit, vegetables and cereals fresh or processed	Reg. CE n. 1623 of 04.10.05, Reg. UE n. 611 of 12.07.10	GUCE L. 259 of 05.10.05, GUUE L. 178 of 13.07.10	Liguria	Genoa, Imperia, Savona
21	Bergamotto di Reggio Calabria - Olio essenziale	PDO	Essential oils	Reg. CE n. 509 of 15.03.01	GUCE L. 76 of 16.03.01	Calabria	Reggio Calabria
22	Bitto	PDO	Cheeses	Reg. CE n. 1263 of 01.07.96, Reg. CE n. 1138 of 25.11.09	GUCE L. 163 of 02.07.96, GUCE L. 311 of 26.11.09	Lombardy	Sondrio, Bergamo
23	Bra	PDO	Cheeses	Reg. CE n. 1263 of 01.07.96	GUCE L. 163 of 02.07.96	Piedmont	Cuneo, Turin
24	Bresaola ofla Valtellina	PGI	Prodotti a base di carne	Reg. CE n. 1263 of 01.07.96	GUCE L. 163 of 02.07.96	Lombardy	Sondrio
25	Brisighella	PDO	Oils	Reg. CE n. 1263 of 01.07.96	GUCE L. 163 of 02.07.96	Emilia-Romagna	Ravenna, Forlì
26	Bruzio	PDO	Oils	Reg. CE n. 1065 of 12.06.97	GUCE L. 156 of 13.06.97	Calabria	Cosenza
27	Caciocavallo Silano	PDO	Cheeses	Reg. CE n. 1263 of 01.07.96, Reg. CE n. 1204 of 04.07.03	GUCE L. 163 of 02.07.96, GUCE L. 168 of 05.97.03	Calabria, Campania, Molise, Apulia, Basilicata	Avellino, Bari, Benevento, Brindisi, Campobasso, Caserta, Catanzaro, Cosenza, Foggia, Isernia, Matera, Naples, Potenza, Salerno, Taranto
28	Canestrato di Moliterno	PGI	Cheeses	Reg. UE n. 441 of 21.05.10	GUUE L. 126 of 22.05.10	Basilicata	Potenza e Matera
29	Canestrato Pugliese	PDO	Cheeses	Reg. CE n. 1107 of 12.06.96	GUCE L. 148 of 21.06.96	Apulia	Foggia, Bari
30	Canino	PDO	Oils	Reg. CE n. 1263 of 01.07.96	GUCE L. 163 of 02.07.96	Lazio	Viterbo
31	Capocollo di Calabria	PDO	Meat products (cooked, salted, smoked, etc.)	Reg. CE n. 134 of 20.01.98,	GUCE L. 15 of 21.01.98	Calabria	Catanzaro, Cosenza, Crotone, Reggio Calabria, Vibo Valentia
32	Cappero di Pantelleria	PGI	Fruit, vegetables and cereals fresh or processed	Reg. CE n. 1107 of 12.06.96, Reg. UE n. 880 of 06.10.10	GUCE L. 148 of 21.06.96, GUUE L. 264 of 07.10.10	Sicily	Trapani
33	Carciofo di Paestum	PGI	Fruit, vegetables and cereals fresh or processed	Reg. CE n. 465 of 12.03.04	GUCE L. 77 of 13.03.04	Campania	Salerno
34	Carciofo Romanesco of Lazio	PGI	Fruit, vegetables and cereals fresh or processed	Reg. CE n. 2066 of 21.11.02	GUCE L. 218 of 22.11.02	Lazio	Latina, Rome, Viterbo
35	Carciofo Spinoso di Sardegna	PDO	Fruit, vegetables and cereals fresh or processed	Reg. UE n. 94 of 03.02.11	GUUE L. 30 of 04.02.11	Sardinia	Cagliari, Carbonia-Iglesias, Medio Campidano, Oristano, Nuoro, Ogliastra, Sassari, Olbia-Tempio
36	Carota ofl'Altopiano of Fucino	PGI	Fruit, vegetables and cereals fresh or processed	Reg. CE n. 148 of 15.02.07	GUCE L. 46 of 16.02.07	Abruzzo	L'Aquila
37	Carota Novella di Ispica	PGI	Fruit, vegetables and cereals fresh or processed	Reg. UE n. 1214 of 17.12.10	GUUE L. 335 of 18.12.10	Sicily	Catania, Caltanissetta, Ragusa, Syracuse
38	Cartoceto	PDO	Oils	Reg. CE n. 1897 of 29.10.04	GUCE L. 328 of 30.10.04	Marche	Pesaro-Urbino
39	Casatella Trevigiana	PDO	Cheeses	Reg. CE n. 487 of 02.06.08	GUCE L. 143 of 03.06.08	Veneto	Treviso
40	Casciotta d'Urbino	PDO	Cheeses	Reg. CE n. 1107 of 12.06.96	GUCE L. 148 of 21.06.96	Marche	Pesaro-Urbino
41	Castagna Cuneo	PGI	Fruit, vegetables and cereals fresh or processed	Reg. CE n. 1050 of 12.09.07	GUCE L. 240 of 13.09.07	Piedmont	Cuneo
42	Castagna of Monte Amiata	PGI	Fruit, vegetables and cereals fresh or processed	Reg. CE n. 1904 of 07.09.00, Reg. UE n. 1108 of 30.11.10	GUCE L. 228 of 08.09.00, GUUE L. 315 of 01.12.10	Tuscany	Grosseto, Siena
43	Castagna di Montella	PGI	Fruit, vegetables and cereals fresh or processed	Reg. CE n. 1107 of 12.06.96	GUCE L. 148 of 21.06.96	Campania	Avellino
44	Castagna di Vallerano	PDO	Fruit, vegetables and cereals fresh or processed	Reg. CE n. 286 of 7.04.09	GUCE L. 94 of 08.04.09	Lazio	Viterbo
45	Castelmagno	PDO	Cheeses	Reg. CE n. 1263 of 01.07.96	GUCE L. 163 of 02.07.96	Piedmont	Cuneo
46	Chianti Classico	PDO	Oils	Reg. CE n. 2446 of 06.11.00	GUCE L. 281 of 07.11.00	Tuscany	Siena, Florence
47	Ciauscolo	PGI	Meat products (cooked, salted, smoked, etc.)	Reg. CE n. 729 of 10.08.09,	GUCE L. 207 ofl'11.08.09	Marche	Ancona, Ascoli Piceno, Macerata
48	Cilento	PDO	Oils	Reg. CE n. 1065 of 12.06.97	GUCE L. 156 of 13.06.97	Campania	Salerno
49	Ciliegia di Marostica	PGI	Fruit, vegetables and cereals fresh or processed	Reg. CE n. 245 of 08.02.02	GUCE L. 39 of 09.02.02	Veneto	Vicenza
50	Cipolla Rossa di Tropea	PGI	Fruit, vegetables and cereals fresh or processed	Reg. CE n. 284 of 27.03.08	GUCE L. 86 of 28.03.08	Calabria	Catanzaro, Cosenza, Vibo Valentia
51	Cipollotto Nocerino	PDO	Fruit, vegetables and cereals fresh or processed	Reg. CE n. 656 of 10.07.08	GUCE L. 183 ofl'11.07.08	Campania	Naples, Salerno
52	Clementine of Golfo di Taranto	PGI	Fruit, vegetables and cereals fresh or processed	Reg. CE n. 1665 of 22.09.03	GUCE L. 235 of 23.09.03	Apulia	Taranto
53	Clementine di Calabria	PGI	Fruit, vegetables and cereals fresh or processed	Reg. CE n. 2325 of 24.11.97	GUCE L. 322 of 25.11.97	Calabria	Reggio Calabria, Catanzaro, Cosenza, Vibo Valentia, Crotone
54	Collina di Brindisi	PDO	Oils	Reg. CE n. 1263 of 01.07.96	GUCE L. 163 of 02.07.96	Apulia	Brindisi
55	Colline di Romagna	PDO	Oils	Reg. CE n. 1491 of 25.08.03	GUCE L. 214 of 26.08.03	Emilia-Romagna	Forlì - Cesena, Rimini
56	Colline Pontine	PDO	Oils	Reg. UE n. 259 of 25.03.10	GUUE L. 80 of 26.03.10	Lazio	Latina
57	Colline Salernitane	PDO	Oils	Reg. CE n. 1065 of 12.06.97	GUCE L. 156 of 13.06.97	Campania	Salerno
58	Colline Teatine	PDO	Oils	Reg. CE n. 1065 of 12.06.97	GUCE L. 156 of 13.06.97	Abruzzo	Chieti
59	Coppa Piacentina	PDO	Meat products (cooked, salted, smoked, etc.)	Reg. CE n. 1263 of 01.07.96,	GUCE L. 163 of 02.07.96	Emilia-Romagna	Piacenza
60	Coppia Ferrarese	PGI	Bread, pastry, cakes, confectionery, biscuits and other baker's wares	Reg. CE n. 2036 of 17.10.01	GUCE L. 275 of 18.10.01	Emilia-Romagna	Ferrara
61	Cotechino Modena	PGI	Meat products (cooked, salted, smoked, etc.)	Reg. CE n. 590 of 18.03.99	GUCE L. 74 of 19.03.99	Emilia-Romagna, Lombardy, Veneto	Modena, Ferrara, Ravenna, Rimini, Forlì-Cesena, Bologna, Reggio Emilia, Parma, Piacenza, Cremona, Lodi, Pavia, Milan, Varese, Como, Lecco, Bergamo, Brescia, Mantua, Verona, Rovigo
62	Crudo di Cuneo	PDO	Meat products (cooked, salted, smoked, etc.)	Reg. UE n. 1239 of 15.12.09	GUUE L. 332 of 17.12.09	Piedmont	Asti, Cuneo, Turin
63	Culatello di Zibello	PDO	Meat products (cooked, salted, smoked, etc.)	Reg. CE n. 1263 of 01.07.96	GUCE L. 163 of 02.07.96	Emilia-Romagna	Parma
64	Dauno	PDO	Oils	Reg. CE n. 2325 of 24.11.97	GUCE L. 322 of 25.11.97	Apulia	Foggia
224	Fagioli Bianchi di Rotonda	PDO	Fruit, vegetables and cereals fresh or processed			Basilicata	Potenza
223	Fagiolo Cannellino di Atina	PDO	Fruit, vegetables and cereals fresh or processed	Reg. UE n. 699 of 04.08.10	GUUE L. 203 of 05.08.10	Lazio	Frosinone
66	Fagiolo Cuneo	PGI	Fruit, vegetables and cereals fresh or processed			Piedmont	Cuneo
66	Fagiolo di Lamon ofla Vallata Bellunese	PGI	Fruit, vegetables and cereals fresh or processed	Reg. CE n. 1263 of 01.07.96	GUCE L. 163 of 02.07.96	Veneto	Belluno
67	Fagiolo di Sarconi	PGI	Fruit, vegetables and cereals fresh or processed	Reg. CE n. 1263 of 01.07.96	GUCE L. 163 of 02.07.96	Basilicata	Potenza
68	Fagiolo di Sorana	PGI	Fruit, vegetables and cereals fresh or processed	Reg. CE n. 1018 of 13.06.02	GUCE L. 155 of 14.06.02	Tuscany	Pistoia
69	Farina di Neccio ofla Garfagnana	PDO	Fruit, vegetables and cereals fresh or processed	Reg. CE n. 465 of 12.03.04	GUCE L. 77 of 13.03.04	Tuscany	Lucca
70	Farro ofla Garfagnana	PGI	Fruit, vegetables and cereals fresh or processed	Reg. CE n. 1263 of 01.07.96	GUCE L. 163 of 02.07.96	Tuscany	Lucca
71	Farro di Monteleone di Spoleto	PDO	Fruit, vegetables and cereals fresh or processed	Reg. UE n. 623 of 15.07.10	GUUE L. 182 of 16.07.10	Umbria	Perugia
72	Fico Bianco of Cilento	PDO	Fruit, vegetables and cereals fresh or processed	Reg. CE n. 417 of 10.03.06	GUCE L. 72 of 11.03.06	Campania	Salerno
73	Ficodindia ofl'Etna	PDO	Fruit, vegetables and cereals fresh or processed	Reg. CE n. 1491 of 25.08.03	GUCE L. 214 of 26.08.03	Sicily	Catania
74	Fiore Sardo	PDO	Cheeses	Reg. CE n. 1107 of 12.06.96	GUCE L. 148 of 21.06.96	Sardinia	Cagliari, Nuoro, Oristano, Sassari, Carbonia-Iglesias, Medio Campidano, Ogliastra, Olbia-Tempio
75	Fontina	PDO	Cheeses	Reg. CE n. 1107 of 12.06.96;VReg. UE n. 93 of 03.02.11	GUCE L. 148 of 21.06.96; GUUE L. 30 of 04.02.11	Aosta Valley	Aosta
76	Formaggio di Fossa di Sogliano	PDO	Cheeses	Reg. CE n. 1183 of 30.11.09	GUCE L. 317 of 03.12.09	Emilia-Romagna, Marche	Forlì-Cesena, Rimini, Ravenna, Bologna, Pesaro-Urbino, Ancona, Macerata, Ascoli Piceno
77	Formai de Mut ofl'Alta Valle Brembana	PDO	Cheeses	Reg. CE n. 1107 of 12.06.96	GUCE L. 148 of 21.06.96	Lombardy	Bergamo
78	Fungo di Borgotaro	PGI	Fruit, vegetables and cereals fresh or processed	Reg. CE n. 1107 of 12.06.96	GUCE L. 148 of 21.06.96	Emilia-Romagna, Tuscany	Parma, Massa Carrara
79	Garda	PDO	Oils	Reg. CE n. 2325 of 24.11.97	GUCE L. 322 of 25.11.97	Lombardy, Veneto, Trentino	Brescia, Verona, Mantua, Trento
80	Gorgonzola	PDO	Cheeses	Reg. CE n. 1107 of 12.06.96, Reg. CE n. 104 of 03.02.09	GUCE L. 148 of 21.06.96, GUCE L. 34 of 04.02.09	Piedmont, Lombardy	Alessandria, Bergamo, Brescia, Como, Cremona, Cuneo, Milan, Novara, Pavia, Vercelli
81	Grana Padano	PDO	Cheeses	Reg. CE n. 1107 of 12.06.96	GUCE L. 148 of 21.06.96	Emilia-Romagna, Lombardy, Piedmont, Trentino, Veneto	Alessandria, Asti, Cuneo, Novara, Turin, Vercelli, Bergamo, Brescia, Como, Cremona, Mantua, Milan, Pavia, Sondrio, Varese, Padua, Trento, Rovigo, Treviso, Venice, Verona, Vicenza, Bologna, Ferrara, Forlì, Piacenza, Ravenna
82	Insalata di Lusia	PGI	Fruit, vegetables and cereals fresh or processed	Reg. CE n. 1137 of 25.11.09	GUCE L. 311 of 26.11.09	Veneto	Padua, Rovigo
83	Irpinia - Colline ofl'Ufita	PDO	Oils	Reg. UE . 203 of 10.03.10	GUUE L. 61 ofl'11.03.10	Campania	Avellino
84	Kiwi Latina	PGI	Fruit, vegetables and cereals fresh or processed	Reg. CE n. 1486 of 20.08.04	GUCE L. 273 of 21.08.04	Lazio	Latina, Rome
85	La Bella ofla Daunia	PDO	Fruit, vegetables and cereals fresh or processed	Reg. CE n. 1904 of 07.09.00, Reg. CE n. 1067 of 06.11.09	GUCE L. 228 of 08.09.00, GUCE L. 291 of 07.11.09	Apulia	Foggia
86	Laghi Lombardi	PDO	Oils	Reg. CE n. 2325 of 24.11.97	GUCE L. 322 of 25.11.97	Lombardy	Brescia, Bergamo, Como, Lecco
87	Lametia	PDO	Oils	Reg. CE n. 2107 of 04.10.99	GUCE L. 258 of 05.10.99	Calabria	Catanzaro
88	Lardo di Colonnata	PGI	Meat products (cooked, salted, smoked, etc.)	Reg. CE n. 1856 of 26.10.04	GUCE L. 324 of 27.10.04	Tuscany	Massa Carrara
89	Lenticchia di Castelluccio di Norcia	PGI	Fruit, vegetables and cereals fresh or processed	Reg. CE n. 1065 of 12.06.97	GUCE L. 156 of 13.06.97	Umbria, Marche	Macerata, Perugia
90	Limone Costa d'Amalfi	PGI	Fruit, vegetables and cereals fresh or processed	Reg. CE n. 1356 of 04.07.01	GUCE L. 182 of 05.07.01	Campania	Salerno
91	Limone di Siracusa	PGI	Fruit, vegetables and cereals fresh or processed	Reg. UE n. 96 of 03.02.11	GUUE L. 30 of 04.02.11	Sicily	Syracuse
92	Limone di Sorrento	PGI	Fruit, vegetables and cereals fresh or processed	Reg. CE n. 2446 of 06.11.00, Reg. UE n. 14 of 10.01.11	GUCE L. 281 of 07.11.00, GUUE L. 6 ofl'11.01.11	Campania	Naples
93	Limone Femminello of Gargano	PGI	Fruit, vegetables and cereals fresh or processed	Reg. CE n. 148 of 15.02.07	GUCE L. 46 of 16.02.07	Apulia	Foggia
94	Limone Interdonato di Messina	PGI	Fruit, vegetables and cereals fresh or processed	Reg. CE n. 1081 ofl'11.11.09	GUCE L. 295 of 12.11.09	Sicily	Messina
95	Lucca	PDO	Oils	Reg. CE n. 1845 of 22.10.04	GUCE L. 322 of 23.10.04	Tuscany	Lucca, Massa Carrara
96	Marrone ofla Valle di Sussa	PGI	Fruit, vegetables and cereals fresh or processed	Reg. UE n. 987 of 03.11.10	GUUE L. 286 of 04.11.10	Piedmont	Turin
97	Marrone of Mugello	PGI	Fruit, vegetables and cereals fresh or processed	Reg. CE n. 1263 of 01.07.96	GUCE L. 163 of 02.07.96	Tuscany	Florence
98	Marrone di Caprese Michelangelo	PDO	Fruit, vegetables and cereals fresh or processed	Reg. UE n. 1237 ofl'11.12.09	GUUE L. 332 of 17.12.09	Tuscany	Arezzo
99	Marrone di Castel of Rio	PGI	Fruit, vegetables and cereals fresh or processed	Reg. CE n. 1263 of 01.07.96	GUCE L. 163 of 02.07.96	Emilia-Romagna	Bologna
100	Marrone di Combai	PGI	Fruit, vegetables and cereals fresh or processed	Reg. CE n. 1180 of 30.11.09	GUCE L. 317 of 03.12.09	Veneto	Treviso
101	Marrone di Roccadaspide	PGI	Fruit, vegetables and cereals fresh or processed	Reg. CE n. 284 of 27.03.08	GUCE L. 86 of 28.03.08	Campania	Salerno
102	Marrone di San Zeno	PDO	Fruit, vegetables and cereals fresh or processed	Reg. CE n. 1979 ofl'11.11.03	GUCE L. 294 of 12.11.03	Veneto	Verona
103	Marroni of Monfenera	PGI	Fruit, vegetables and cereals fresh or processed	Reg. CE n. 1132 of 24.11.09	GUCE L. 310 of 25.11.09	Veneto	Treviso
104	Mela Alto Adige or Südtiroler Apfel	PGI	Fruit, vegetables and cereals fresh or processed	Reg. CE n. 1855 of 14.11.05	GUCE L. 297 of 15.11.05	Trentino-Alto Adige/Südtirol	South Tyrol
105	Mela di Valtellina	PGI	Fruit, vegetables and cereals fresh or processed	Reg. UE n. 171 of 01.03.10	GUUE L. 51 of 02.03.10	Lombardy	Sondrio
106	Mela Val di Non	PDO	Fruit, vegetables and cereals fresh or processed	Reg. CE n. 1665 of 22.09.03, Reg. UE n. 778 of 02.09.10	GUCE L. 235 of 23.09.03, GUUE L. 233 of 03.09.10	Trentino	Trento
107	Melannurca Campana	PGI	Fruit, vegetables and cereals fresh or processed	Reg. CE n. 417 of 10.03.06	GUCE L. 72 of 11.03.06	Campania	Avellino, Benevento, Caserta, Naples, Salerno
108	Melanzana Rossa di Rotonda	PDO	Fruit, vegetables and cereals fresh or processed	Reg. UE n. 624 of 15.07.10	GUUE L. 182 of 16.07.10	Basilicata	Potenza
109	Miele ofla Lunigiana	PDO	Other productsi origine animale	Reg. CE n. 1845 of 22.10.04	GUCE L. 322 of 23.10.04	Tuscany	Massa Carrara
110	Molise	PDO	Oils	Reg. CE n. 1257 of 15.07.03	GUCE L. 177 of 16.07.03	Molise	Campobasso, Isernia
111	Montasio	PDO	Cheeses	Reg. CE n. 1107 of 12.06.96	GUCE L. 148 of 21.06.96	Friuli Venezia Giulia, Veneto	Gorizia, Pordenone, Trieste, Udine, Belluno, Treviso, Padua, Venice
112	Monte Etna	PDO	Oils	Reg. CE n. 1491 of 25.08.03	GUCE L. 214 of 26.08.03	Sicily	Catania, Enna, Messina
113	Monte Veronese	PDO	Cheeses	Reg. CE n. 1107 of 12.06.96	GUCE L. 148 of 21.06.96	Veneto	Verona
114	Monti Iblei	PDO	Oils	Reg. CE n. 2325 of 24.11.97, Reg. CE n. 828 of 14.05.03, Reg. UE n. 307 of 14.04.10	GUCE L. 322 of 25.11.97, GUCE L. 120 of 15.05.03, GUUE L. 94 of 15.04.10	Sicily	Catania, Ragusa, Syracuse
115	Mortaofla Bologna	PGI	Meat products (cooked, salted, smoked, etc.)	Reg. CE n. 1549 of 17.07.98	GUCE L. 202 of 17.07.98	Emilia-Romagna, Piedmont, Lombardy, Veneto, Marche, Lazio, Trentino, Tuscany	Modena, Parma, Piacenza, Ravenna, Reggio Emilia, Alessandria, Asti, Cuneo, Novara, Turin, Vercelli, Bergamo, Brescia, Como, Cremona, Mantua, Milan, Pavia, Sondrio, Varese, Belluno, Padua, Rovigo, Treviso, Venezia, Verona, Vicenza, Ancona, Ascoli Piceno, Macerata, Pesaro-Urbino, Rome, Frosinone, Viterbo, Latina, Rieti, Trento, Arezzo, Florence, Grosseto, Livorno, Lucca, Massa Carrara, Pisa, Pistoia, Siena, Ferrara, Forlì - Cesena
116	Mozzarella di Bufala Campana	PDO	Cheeses	Reg. CE n. 1107 of 12.06.96, Reg. CE n. 103 of 04.02.08	GUCE L. 148 of 21.06.96, GUCE L. 31 of 05.02.08	Campania, Lazio, Molise, Apulia	Benevento, Caserta, Naples, Salerno, Frosinone, Latina, Rome, Foggia, Isernia
117	Murazzano	PDO	Cheeses	Reg. CE n. 1107 of 12.06.96	GUCE L. 148 of 21.06.96	Piedmont	Cuneo
118	Nocciola of Piemonte or Nocciola Piemonte	PGI	Fruit, vegetables and cereals fresh or processed	Reg. CE n. 1107 of 12.06.96, Reg. CE n. 464 of 12.03.04	GUCE L. 148 of 21.06.96, GUCE L. 77 of 13.03.04	Piedmont	Alessandria, Asti, Cuneo, Novara, Turin, Vercelli
119	Nocciola di Giffoni	PGI	Fruit, vegetables and cereals fresh or processed	Regsar. CE n. 2325 of 24.11.97, Reg. CE n. 1257 of 21.08.06	GUCE L. 322 of 25.11.97, GUCE L. 228 of 22.08.06	Campania	Salerno
120	Nocciola Romana	PDO	Fruit, vegetables and cereals fresh or processed	Reg. CE n. 667 of 22.07.09	GUCE L. 194 of 25.07.09	Lazio	Viterbo, Rome
121	Nocellara of Belice	PDO	Fruit, vegetables and cereals fresh or processed	Reg. CE n. 134 of 20.01.98	GUCE L. 15 of 21.01.98	Sicily	Trapani
122	Oliva Ascolana of Piceno	PDO	Fruit, vegetables and cereals fresh or processed	Reg. CE n. 1855 of 14.11.05	GUCE L. 297 of 15.11.05	Marche, Abruzzo	Ascoli, Teramo
123	Pagnotta of Dittaino	PDO	Bread, pastry, cakes, confectionery, biscuits and other baker's wares	Reg. CE n. 516 of 17.06.09	GUCE L. 155 of 18.06.09	Sicily	Enna, Catania
124	Pancetta di Calabria	PDO	Meat products (cooked, salted, smoked, etc.)	Reg. CE n. 134 of 20.01.98	GUCE L. 15 of 21.01.98	Calabria	Catanzaro, Cosenza, Crotone, Reggio Calabria, Vibo Valentia
125	Pancetta Piacentina	PDO	Meat products (cooked, salted, smoked, etc.)	Reg. UE n. 1170 of 10.12.10	GUCE L. 163 of 02.07.96, GUUE L. 327 ofl'11.12.10	Emilia-Romagna	Piacenza
126	Pane casareccio di Genzano	PGI	Bread, pastry, cakes, confectionery, biscuits and other baker's wares	Reg. CE n. 2325 of 24.11.97	GUCE L. 322 of 25.11.97	Lazio	Roma
127	Pane di Altamura	PDO D.O.P.	Bread, pastry, cakes, confectionery, biscuits and other baker's wares	Reg. CE n. 1291 of 18.7.03	GUCE L. 181 of 19.7.03	Apulia	Bari
128	Pane di Matera	PGI	Bread, pastry, cakes, confectionery, biscuits and other baker's wares	Reg. CE n. 160 of 21.02.08	GUCE L. 48 of 22.02.08	Basilicata	Matera
129	Parmigiano Reggiano	PDO	Cheeses	Reg. CE n. 1107 of 12.06.96, Reg. CE n. 1571 of 06.09.03	GUCE L. 148 of 21.06.96, GUCE L. 224 of 06.09.03	Emilia-Romagna, Lombardy	Parma, Reggio Emilia, Modena, Bologna, Mantua
130	Patata ofla Sila	PGI	Fruit, vegetables and cereals fresh or processed	Reg. UE n. 898 of 08.10.10	GUUE L. 266 of 09.10.10	Calabria	Cosenza, Catanzaro
131	Patata di Bologna	PDO	Fruit, vegetables and cereals fresh or processed	Reg. UE n. 228 of 18.03.10	GUUE L. 69 of 19.03.10	Emilia-Romagna	Bologna
132	Pecorino di Filiano	PDO	Cheeses	Reg. CE n. 1485 of 14.12.07	GUCE L. 330 of 15.12.07	Basilicata	Potenza
133	Pecorino Romano	PDO	Cheeses	Reg. CE n. 1107 of 12.06.96, Reg. CE n. 1030 of 29.10.09	GUCE L. 148 of 21.06.96, GUCE L. 283 of 30.10.09	Tuscany, Lazio, Sardinia	Frosinone, Grosseto, Latina, Rome, Viterbo, Cagliari, Nuoro, Sassari
134	Pecorino Sardo	PDO	Cheeses	Reg. CE n. 1263 of 01.07.96	GUCE L. 163 of 02.07.96	Sardinia	Cagliari, Nuoro, Oristano, Sassari, Carbonia-Iglesias, Medio Campidano, Ogliastra, Olbia-Tempio
135	Pecorino Siciliano	PDO	Cheeses	Reg. CE n. 1107 of 12.06.96	GUCE L. 148 of 21.06.96	Sicily	Agrigento, Caltanissetta, Catania, Enna, Messina, Palermo, Ragusa, Syracuse, Trapani
136	Pecorino Toscano	PDO	Cheeses	Reg. CE n. 1263 of 01.07.96, Reg. UE n. 306 of 14.04.10	GUCE L. 163 of 02.07.96, GUUE L. 94 of 15.04.10	Tuscany, Umbria, Lazio	Arezzo, Florence, Grosseto, Siena, Livorno, Lucca, Massa Carrara, Pistoia, Pisa, Viterbo, Terni
137	Penisola Sorrentina	PDO	Oils	Reg. CE n. 1065 of 12.06.97	GUCE L. 156 of 13.06.97	Campania	Naples
138	Peperone di Pontecorvo	PDO	Fruit, vegetables and cereals fresh or processed	Reg. UE n. 1021 of 12.11.10	GUUE L. 296 of 13.11.10	Lazio	Frosinone
139	Peperone di Senise	PGI	Fruit, vegetables and cereals fresh or processed	Reg. CE n. 1263 of 01.07.96	GUCE L. 163 of 02.07.96	Basilicata	Potenza, Matera
140	Pera ofl'Emilia Romagna	PGI	Fruit, vegetables and cereals fresh or processed	Reg. CE n. 134 of 20.01.98, Reg. CE n. 515 of 17.06.09	GUCE L. 15 of 21.01.98, GUCE L. 155 of 18.06.09	Emilia-Romagna	Reggio Emilia, Modena, Ferrara, Bologna, Ravenna
141	Pera mantovana	PGI	Fruit, vegetables and cereals fresh or processed	Reg. CE n. 134 of 20.01.98	GUCE L. 15 of 21.01.98	Lombardy	Mantua
142	Pesca di Leonforte	PGI	Fruit, vegetables and cereals fresh or processed	Reg. UE n. 622 of 15.07.10	GUUE L. 182 of 16.07.10	Sicily	Enna
143	Pesca di Verona	PGI	Fruit, vegetables and cereals fresh or processed	Reg. UE n. 30 of 14.01.10	GUUE L. 10 of 15.01.10	Veneto	Verona
144	Pesca e Nettarina di Romagna	PGI	Fruit, vegetables and cereals fresh or processed	Reg. CE n. 134 of 20.01.98, Reg. UE n. 701 of 04.08.10	GUCE L. 15 of 21.01.98, GUUE L. 203 of 05.0.8.10	Emilia-Romagna	Ferrara, Bologna, Forlì - Cesena, Ravenna
145	Piacentinu Ennese	PDO	Cheeses	Reg. UE n. 132 of 14.02.11	GUUE L. 41 of 15.02.11	Sicily	Enna
146	Piave	PDO	Cheeses	Reg. UE n. 443 of 21.05.10	GUUE L. 126 of 22.05.10	Veneto	Belluno
147	Pistacchio Verde di Bronte	PDO	Fruit, vegetables and cereals fresh or processed	Reg. UE n. 21 of 12.01.10	GUUE L. 8 of 13.01.10	Sicily	Catania
148	Pomodorino of Piennolo of Vesuvio	PDO	Fruit, vegetables and cereals fresh or processed	Reg. UE n. 1238 ofl'11.12.09	GUUE L. 332 of 17.12.09	Campania	Naples
149	Pomodoro di Pachino	PGI	Fruit, vegetables and cereals fresh or processed	Reg. CE n. 617 of 04.04.03	GUCE L. 89 of 05.04.03	Sicily	Ragusa, Syracuse
150	Pomodoro S. Marzano ofl'Agro Sarnese-Nocerino	PDO	Fruit, vegetables and cereals fresh or processed	Reg. CE n. 1263 of 01.07.96	GUCE L. 163 of 02.07.96	Campania	Salerno, Avellino, Naples
151	Pretuziano ofle Colline Teramane	PDO	Oils	Reg. CE n. 1491 of 25.08.03	GUCE L. 214 of 26.08.03	Abruzzo	Teramo
152	Prosciutto di Carpegna	PDO	Meat products (cooked, salted, smoked, etc.)	Reg. UE n. 308 of 14.04.10	GUCE L. 163 of 02.07.96, GUUE L. 94 of 15.04.10	Marche	Pesaro-Urbino
153	Prosciutto di Modena	PDO	Meat products (cooked, salted, smoked, etc.)	Reg. CE n. 1107 of 12.06.96	GUCE L. 148 of 21.06.96	Emilia-Romagna	Modena, Bologna, Reggio Emilia
154	Prosciutto di Norcia	PGI	Meat products (cooked, salted, smoked, etc.)	Reg. CE n. 1082 of 11.11.09	GUCE L. 156 of 13.06.97, GUCE L. 295 of 12.11.09	Umbria	Perugia
155	Prosciutto di Parma	PDO	Meat products (cooked, salted, smoked, etc.)	Reg. CE n. 102 of 04.02.08, Reg. UE n. 148 of 23.02.10	GUCE L. 148 of 21.06.96, GUCE L. 31 of 05.02.08, GUUE L. 47 of 24.02.10	Emilia-Romagna	Parma
156	Prosciutto di S. Daniele	PDO	Meat products (cooked, salted, smoked, etc.)	Reg. CE n. 1107 of 12.06.96	GUCE L. 148 of 21.06.96	Friuli Venezia Giulia	Udine
157	Prosciutto di Sauris	PGI	Meat products (cooked, salted, smoked, etc.)	Reg. UE n. 320 of 19.04.10	GUUE L. 98 of 20.04.10	Friuli Venezia Giulia	Udine
158	Prosciutto Toscano	PDO	Meat products (cooked, salted, smoked, etc.)	Reg. UE n. 777 of 02.09.10	GUCE L. 163 of 02.07.96, GUUE L. 233 of 03.09.10	Tuscany	Arezzo, Firenze, Grosseto, Siena, Livorno, Lucca, Massa Carrara, Pistoia, Pisa
159	Prosciutto Veneto Berico-Euganeo	PDO	Meat products (cooked, salted, smoked, etc.)	Reg. CE n. 1107 of 12.06.96	GUCE L. 148 of 21.06.96	Veneto	Vicenza, Verona, Padua
160	Provolone of Monaco	PDO	Cheeses	Reg. UE n. 121 of 09.02.10	GUUE L. 38 ofl'11.02.10	Campania	Naples
161	Provolone Valpadana	PDO	Cheeses	Reg. CE n. 1107 of 12.06.96	GUCE L. 148 of 21.06.96	Trentino, Lombardy, Veneto, Emilia-Romagna	Cremona, Brescia, Verona, Vicenza, Rovigo, Padua, Piacenza, Bergamo, Mantua, Milan, Trento
162	Quartirolo Lombardo	PDO	Cheeses	Reg. CE n. 1107 of 12.06.96	GUCE L. 148 of 21.06.96	Lombardy	Brescia, Bergamo, Como, Cremona, Milan, Pavia, Varese
163	Radicchio di Chioggia	PGI	Fruit, vegetables and cereals fresh or processed	Reg. CE n. 1025 of 17.10.08	GUCE L. 277 of 18.10.08	Veneto	Venice, Padua, Rovigo
164	Radicchio di Verona	PGI	Fruit, vegetables and cereals fresh or processed	Reg. CE n. 98 of 02.02.09	GUCE L. 33 of 03.02.09	Veneto	Verona, Vicenza, Padua
165	Radicchio Rosso di Treviso	PGI	Fruit, vegetables and cereals fresh or processed	Reg. CE n. 1263 of 01.07.96, Reg. CE n. 784 of 05.08.08	GUCE L. 163 of 02.07.96, GUCE L. 209 of 06.08.08	Veneto	Treviso, Padua, Venice
166	Radicchio Variegato di Castelfranco	PGI	Fruit, vegetables and cereals fresh or processed	Reg. CE n. 1263 of 01.07.96, Reg. CE n. 784 of 05.08.08	GUCE L. 163 of 02.07.96, GUCE L. 209 of 06.08.08	Veneto	Treviso, Padua, Venice
167	Ragusano	PDO	Cheeses	Reg. CE n. 1263 of 01.07.96	GUCE L. 163 of 02.07.96	Sicily	Ragusa, Syracuse
168	Raschera	PDO	Cheeses	Reg. CE n. 1107 of 12.06.96	GUCE L. 148 of 21.06.96	Piedmont	Cuneo
169	Ricciarelli di Siena	PGI	Bread, pastry, cakes, confectionery, biscuits and other baker's wares	Reg. UE n. 229 of 18.03.10	GUUE L. 69 of 19.03.10	Tuscany	Siena
170	Ricotta di Bufala Campana	PDO	Other products of animal origin	Reg. UE n. 634 of 19.07.10	GUUE L. 186 of 20.07.10	Campania, Lazio, Molise, Apulia	Benevento, Caserta, Naples, Salerno, Frosinone, Latina, Rome, Foggia, Isernia
171	Ricotta Romana	PDO	Other products of animal origin	Reg. CE n. 737 of 13.05.05, Reg. UE n. 1192 of 16.12.10	GUCE L. 122 of 14.05.05, GUUE L. 333 of 17.12.10	Lazio	Rome, Frosinone, Viterbo, Latina, Rieti
172	Riso of ofta of Po	PGI	Fruit, vegetables and cereals fresh or processed	Reg. CE n. 1078 of 10.11.09	GUCE L. 294 ofl'11.11.09	Veneto, Emilia-Romagna	Rovigo, Ferrara
173	Riso di Baraggia Biellese e Vercellese	PDO	Fruit, vegetables and cereals fresh or processed	Reg. CE n. 982 of 21.08.07	GUCE L. 217 of 22.08.07	Piedmont	Biella, Vercelli
174	Riso Nano Vialone Veronese	PGI	Fruit, vegetables and cereals fresh or processed	Reg. CE n. 1263 of 01.07.96, Reg. CE n. 205 of 16.03.09 Rettifica	GUCE L. 163 of 02.07.96, GUCE L. 71 of 17.03.09, GUUE L. 221 of 24.08.10	Veneto	Verona
175	Riviera Ligure	PDO	Oils	Reg. CE n. 123 of 23.01.97	GUCE L. 122 of 24.01.97	Liguria	Imperia, Savona, Genoa, La Spezia
176	Robiola di Roccaverano	PDO	Cheeses	Reg. CE n. 1263 of 01.07.96	GUCE L. 163 of 02.07.96	Piedmont	Asti, Alessandria
177	Sabina (oil)	PDO	Oils	Reg. CE n. 1263 of 01.07.96, Reg. CE n. 510 of 16.06.09	GUCE L. 163 of 02.07.96, GUCE L. 153 of 17.06.09	Lazio	Rome, Rieti
178	Salame Brianza	PDO	Meat products (cooked, salted, smoked, etc.)	Reg. CE n. 1107 of 12.06.96	GUCE L. 148 of 21.06.96	Lombardy	Brescia, Bergamo, Como, Cremona, Milan, Pavia, Varese
179	Salame Cremona	IGP	Meat products (cooked, salted, smoked, etc.)	Reg. CE n. 1362 of 23.11.07	GUCE L. 305 of 23.11.07	Lombardy, Emilia-Romagna, Piedmont, Veneto	Bergamo, Brescia, Como, Cremona, Lecco, Lodi, Mantua, Milan, Monza-Brianza, Pavia, Sondrio, Varese, Bologna, Ferrara, Forlì-Cesena, Modena, Parma, Piacenza, Ravenna, Reggioo Emilia, Rimini, Alessandria, Asti, Biella, Cuneo, Novara, Turin, Verbano-Cusio-Ossola, Vercelli, Belluno, Padua, Rovigo, Treviso, Venice, Verona, Vicenza
180	Salame di Varzi	PDO	Meat products (cooked, salted, smoked, etc.)	Reg. CE n. 1107 of 12.06.96	GUCE L. 148 of 21.06.96	Lombardy	Pavia
181	Salame d'oca di Mortara	IGP	Meat products (cooked, salted, smoked, etc.)	Reg. CE n. 1165 of 24.06.04	GUCE L. 224 of 25.06.04	Lombardy	Pavia
182	Salame Piacentino	PDO	Meat products (cooked, salted, smoked, etc.)	Reg. CE n. 1263 of 01.07.96; Reg. UE n. 92 of 03.02.11	GUCE L. 163 of 02.07.96; GUUE L. 30 of 04.02.11	Emilia-Romagna	Piacenza
183	Salame S. Angelo	IGP	Meat products (cooked, salted, smoked, etc.)	Reg. CE n. 944 of 25.09.08	GUCE L.258 of 26.09.08	Sicily	Messina
184	Salamini italiani alla cacciatora	PDO	Meat products (cooked, salted, smoked, etc.)	Reg. CE n. 1778 of 07.09.01	GUCE L. 240 of 08.09.01	Abruzzo, Emilia-Romagna, Friuli Venezia Giulia, Lazio, Lombardy, Marche, Piedmont, Tuscany, Umbria, Molise, Veneto	L'Aquila, Chieti, Pescara, Teramo, Bologna, Ferrara, Forlì, Modena, Parma, Piacenza, Ravenna, Reggio Emilia, Gorizia, Pordenone, Trieste, Udine, Rome, Frosinone, Rieti, Latina, Viterbo, Bergamo, Brescia, Como, Cremona, Mantua, Milan, Pavia, Sondrio, Varese, Ancona, Ascoli Piceno, Macerata, Pesaro-Urbino, Alessandria, Asti, Cuneo, Novara, Turin, Vercelli, Arezzo, Siena, Firenze, Pisa, Pistoia, Grosseto, Livorno, Lucca, Massa Carrara, Perugia, Terni, Campobasso, Isernia, Belluno, Padua, Rovigo, Treviso, Venice, Verona, Vicenza
185	Salsiccia di Calabria	PDO	Meat products (cooked, salted, smoked, etc.)	Reg. CE n. 134 of 20.01.98	GUCE L. 15 of 21.01.98	Calabria	Catanzaro, Cosenza, Crotone, Reggio Calabria, Vibo Valentia
186	Sardegna	PDO	Oils	Reg. CE n. 148 of 15.02.07	GUCE L. 46 of 16.02.07	Sardinia	Cagliari, Nuoro, Oristano, Sassari, Carbonia-Iglesias, Medio Campidano, Ogliastra, Olbia-Tempio
187	Scalogno di Romagna	PGI	Fruit, vegetables and cereals fresh or processed	Reg. CE n. 2325 of 24.11.97	GUCE L. 322 of 25.11.97	Emilia-Romagna	Ravenna, Forlì-Cesena, Bologna
188	Sedano Bianco di Sperlonga	PGI	Fruit, vegetables and cereals fresh or processed	Reg. UE n. 222 of 17.03.10	GUUE L. 68 of 18.03.10	Lazio	Latina
189	Soppressata di Calabria		Meat products (cooked, salted, smoked, etc.)	Reg. CE n. 134 of 20.01.98	GUCE L. 15 of 21.01.98	Calabria	Catanzaro, Cosenza, Crotone, Reggio Calabria, Vibo Valentia
190	Soprèssa Vicentina		Meat products (cooked, salted, smoked, etc.)	Reg. CE n. 492 of 18.03.03, Reg. UE n. 588 of 05.07.10	GUCE L. 73 of 19.03.03, GUUE L. 170 of 06.07.10	Veneto	Vicenza
191	Speck ofl'Alto Adige or Südtiroler Markenspeck or Südtiroler Speck	IGP	Meat products (cooked, salted, smoked, etc.)	Reg. CE n. 1107 of 12.06.96	GUCE L. 148 of 21.06.96	Trentino-Alto Adige/Südtirol	South Tyrol
192	Spressa ofle Giudicarie	PDO	Cheeses	Reg. CE n. 2275 of 22.12.03, Reg. UE n. 480 of 01.06.10	GUCE L. 336 of 23.12.03, GUUE L. 135 of 02.06.10	Trentino	Trento
193	Stelvio or Stilfser	PDO	Cheeses	Reg. CE n. 148 of 15.02.07	GUCE L. 46 of 16.02.07	Trentino-Alto Adige/Südtirol	South Tyrol
194	Taleggio	PDO	Cheeses	Reg. CE n. 1107 of 12.06.96	GUCE L. 148 of 21.06.96	Lombardy, Veneto, Piedmont	Bergamo, Brescia, Como, Cremona, Milan, Pavia, Treviso, Novara
195	Tergeste	PDO	Oils	Reg. CE n. 1845 of 22.10.04	GUCE L. 322 of 23.10.04	Friuli Venezia Giulia	Trieste
196	Terra di Bari	PDO	Oils	Reg. CE n. 2325 of 24.11.97	GUCE L. 322 of 25.11.97	Apulia	Bari
197	Terra d'Otranto	PDO	Oils	Reg. CE n. 644 of 20.03.98	GUCE L. 87 of 21.03.98	Apulia	Taranto, Lecce, Brindisi
198	Terre di Siena	PDO	Oils	Reg. CE n. 2446 of 06.11.00	GUCE L. 281 of 07.11.00	Tuscany	Siena
199	Terre Tarentine	PDO	Oils	Reg. CE n. 1898 of 29.10.04	GUCE L. 328 of 30.10.04	Apulia	Taranto
200	Tinca Gobba Dorata of Pianalto di Poirino	PDO	Fresh fish, molluscs, and crustaceans and products derived therefrom	Reg. CE n. 160 of 21.02.08	GUCE L. 48 of 22.02.08	Piedmont	Turin, Asti, Cuneo
201	Toma Piemontese	PDO	Cheeses	Reg. CE n. 1107 of 12.06.96	GUCE L. 148 of 21.06.96	Piedmont	Novara, Vercelli, Biella, Turin, Cuneo, Alessandria, Asti
202	Toscano	PGI	Oils	Reg. CE n. 644 of 20.03.98	GUCE L. 87 of 21.03.98	Tuscany	Grosseto, Massa Carrara, Arezzo, Siena, Florence, Pistoia, Pisa
203	Tuscia	PDO	Oils	Reg. CE n. 1623 of 4.10.05	GUCE L. 259 of 5.10.05	Lazio	Viterbo
204	Umbria	PDO	Oils	Reg. CE n. 2325 of 24.11.97	GUCE L. 322 of 25.11.97	Umbria	Perugia, Terni
205	Uva da tavola di Canicattì	PGI	Fruit, vegetables and cereals fresh or processed	Reg. CE n. 2325 of 24.11.97	GUCE L. 322 of 25.11.97	Sicily	Agrigento, Caltanissetta
206	Uva da tavola di Mazzarrone	PGI	Fruit, vegetables and cereals fresh or processed	Reg. CE n. 617 of 04.04.03	GUCE L. 89 of 05.04.03	Sicily	Catania, Ragusa
207	Val di Mazara	PDO	Oils	Reg. CE n. 138 of 24.01.01	GUCE L. 23 of 25.01.01	Sicily	Palermo, Agrigento
208	Valdemone	PDO	Oils	Reg. CE n. 205 of 4.02.05	GUCE L. 33 of 5.02.05	Sicily	Messina
209	Valle d'Aosta Fromadzo	PDO	Cheeses	Reg. CE n. 1263 of 01.07.96	GUCE L. 163 of 02.07.96	Valle d'Aosta	Aosta
210	Valle d'Aosta Jambon de Bosses	PDO	Meat products (cooked, salted, smoked, etc.)	Reg. CE n. 1263 of 01.07.96	GUCE L. 163 of 02.07.96	Aosta Valley	Aosta
211	Valle d'Aosta Lard d'Arnad	PDO	Meat products (cooked, salted, smoked, etc.)	Reg. CE n. 1263 of 01.07.96	GUCE L. 163 of 02.07.96	Aosta Valley	Aosta
212	Valle of Belice	PDO	Oils	Reg. CE n. 1486 of 20.08.04	GUCE L. 273 of 21.08.04	Sicily	Trapani
213	Valli Trapanesi	PDO	Oils	Reg. CE n. 2325 of 24.11.97	GUCE L. 322 of 25.11.97	Sicily	Trapani
214	Valtellina Casera	PDO	Cheeses	Reg. CE n. 1263 of 01.07.96	GUCE L. 163 of 02.07.96	Lombardy	Sondrio
215	Vastedda ofla valle of Belice	PDO	Cheeses	Reg. UE n. 971 of 28.10.10	GUUE L. 283 of 29.10.10	Sicily	Agrigento, Trapani, Palermo
216	Veneto Valpolicella, Veneto Euganei e Berici, Veneto of Grappa	PDO	Oils	Reg. CE n. 2036 of 17.10.01	GUCE L. 275 of 18.10.01	Veneto	Verona, Padua, Vicenza, Treviso
217	Vitellone bianco ofl'Appenino Centrale	IGP	Fresh meat (and offal)	Reg. CE n. 134 of 20.01.98	GUCE L. 15 of 21.01.98	Emilia-Romagna, Tuscany, Marche, Abruzzo, Molise, Campania, Lazio, Umbria	Bologna, Ravenna, Forlì - Cesena, Rimini, Pesaro-Urbino, Ancona, Macerata, Ascoli Piceno, Teramo, Pescara, Chieti, L'Aquila, Campobasso, Isernia, Benevento, Avellino, Frosinone, Rieti, Viterbo, Terni, Perugia, Grosseto, Siena, Arezzo, Florence, Livorno, Pisa
218	Zafferano ofl'Aquila	PDO	Other products	Reg. CE n. 205 of 4.02.05	GUCE L. 33 of 5.02.05	Abruzzo	L'Aquila
219	Zafferano di San Gimignano	PDO	Other products	Reg. CE n. 205 of 4.02.05	GUCE L. 33 of 5.02.05	Tuscany	Siena
220	Zafferano di Sardegna	PDO	Other products	Reg. CE n. 98 of 02.02.09	GUCE L. 33 of 03.02.09	Sardinia	Medio Campidano
221	Zampone Modena	IGP	Meat products (cooked, salted, smoked, etc.)	Reg. CE n. 590 of 18.03.99	GUCE L. 74 of 19.03.99	Emilia-Romagna, Lombardy, Veneto	Modena, Ferrara, Ravenna, Rimini, Forlì, Bologna, Reggio Emilia, Parma, Piacenza, Cremona, Lodi, Pavia, Milan, Varese, Como, Lecco, Bergamo, Brescia, Mantua, Verona, Rovigo
222	Panforte	IGP	Chewy desert	IT/PGI/0005/0795	22.05.2013	Tuscany	Siena

Sources: Official data of the Italian Ministry of Agriculture updated on 15 February 2011 and of the Quality schemes explained on the Europa.eu website. of

== GI ==
List of GI products, pursuant to Annex III of the Legislative Resolution of the European Parliament n ° P6-TA-2007-0259 of 19 June 2007 "on the proposal for a Regulation of the European Parliament and of the Council relating to the definition, designation, presentation and labeling of alcoholic drinks", updated 22 July 2014:

N.	Definition (official data of European Parliament)	Cat.	Sector	Region
1	Brandy italiano	I.G.	5. Brandy / Weinbrand	Italy
2	Grappa	I.G.	6. Marc brandy	Italy
3	Grappa di Barolo	I.G.	6. Marc brandy	Piedmont
4	Grappa piemontese / Grappa del Piemonte	I.G.	6. Marc brandy	Piedmont
5	Grappa lombarda / Grappa di Lombardia	I.G.	6. Marc brandy	Lombardy
6	Grappa trentina / Grappa del Trentino	I.G.	6. Marc brandy	Trentino
7	Grappa friulana / Grappa del Friuli	I.G.	6. Marc brandy	Friuli-Venezia Giulia
8	Grappa veneta / Grappa del Veneto	I.G.	6. Marc brandy	Veneto
9	Südtiroler Grappa / Grappa dell'Alto Adige	I.G.	6 Marc brandy	Alto Adige
10	Grappa siciliana / Grappa di Sicilia	I.G.	6. Marc brandy	Sicily
11	Grappa di Marsala	I.G.	6. Marc brandy	Sicily
12	Südtiroler Williams / Williams dell'Alto Adige	I.G.	9. Fruit brandy	Alto Adige
13	Südtiroler Aprikot / Aprikot dell'Alto Adige	I.G.	9. Fruit brandy	Alto Adige
14	Südtiroler Marille / Albicocca dell'Alto Adige	I.G.	9. Fruit brandy	Alto Adige
15	Südtiroler Kirsch / Ciliegia dell'Alto Adige	I.G.	9. Fruit brandy	Alto Adige
16	Südtiroler Zwetschgeler / Prugna dell'Alto Adige	I.G.	9. Fruit brandy	Alto Adige
17	Südtiroler Obstler / Obstler dell'Alto Adige	I.G.	9. Fruit brandy	Alto Adige
18	Südtiroler Gravensteiner / Gravensteiner dell'Alto Adige	I.G.	9. Fruit brandy	Alto Adige
19	Südtiroler Golden Delicious / Golden Delicious dell'Alto Adige	I.G.	9. Fruit brandy	Alto Adige
20	Williams friulano / Williams del Friuli	I.G.	9. Fruit brandy	Friuli-Venezia Giulia
21	Sliwovitz del Veneto	I.G.	9. Fruit brandy	Veneto
22	Sliwovitz del Friuli-Venezia Giulia	I.G.	9. Fruit brandy	Friuli-Venezia Giulia
23	Sliwovitz del Trentino-Alto Adige	I.G.	9. Fruit brandy	Trentino and Alto Adige
24	Distillato di mele trentino / Distillato di mele del Trentino	I.G.	9. Fruit brandy	Trentino
25	Williams trentino / Williams del Trentino	I.G.	9. Fruit brandy	Trentino
26	Sliwovitz trentino / Sliwovitz del Trentino	I.G.	9. Fruit brandy	Trentino
27	Aprikot trentino / Aprikot del Trentino	I.G.	9. Fruit brandy	Trentino
28	Kirsch friulano / Kirschwasser Friulano	I.G.	9. Fruit brandy	Friuli-Venezia Giulia
29	Kirsch trentino / Kirschwasser Trentino	I.G.	9. Fruit brandy	Trentino
30	Kirsch veneto / Kirschwasser Veneto	I.G.	9. Fruit brandy	Veneto
31	Südtiroler Enzian / Genziana dell'Alto Adige	I.G.	18. Gentian	Alto Adige
32	Genziana trentina / Genziana del Trentino	I.G.	18. Gentian	Trentino
33	Mirto di Sardegna	I.G.	32. Liquor	Sardinia
34	Liquore di limone di Sorrento	I.G.	32. Liquor	Campania
35	Liquore di limone della Costa d'Amalfi	I.G.	32. Liquor	Campania
36	Genepì del Piemonte	I.G.	32. Liquor	Piedmont
37	Genepì della Valle d'Aosta	I.G.	32. Liquor	Valle d'Aosta
38	Genepì delle Alpi / Génépi des Alpes	I.G.	32. Liquor	Italy/France
39	Nocino di Modena	I.G.	40. Nocino	Emilia-Romagna

== See also ==
- Appellation
- Country of origin
- European Union Common Agricultural Policy
- Genericized trademark
- Geographical indication
- Italian cuisine
- Italian wines
- List of geographical designations for spirit drinks in the European Union
- List of Italian cheeses
- List of Italian DOC wines
- List of Italian DOCG wines
- Protected Geographical Status
- Quality Wines Produced in Specified Regions (QWPSR)
- Strada dell'Olio
