= Strada dell'Olio =

Gastronomical route in Italy

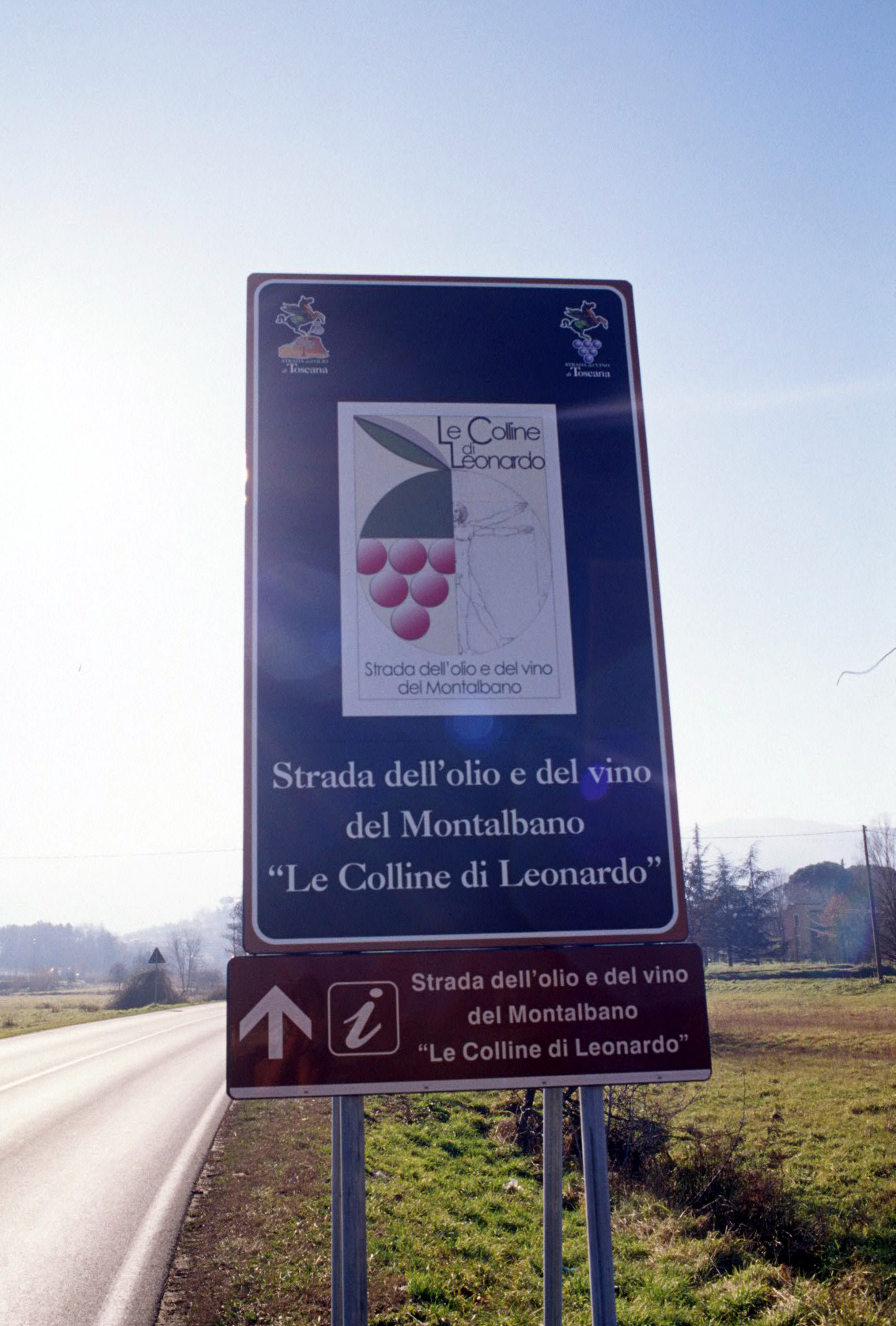
Strada dell'olio sign

Strada dell'olio is a kind of gastronomical route in Italy that crosses a territory rich in traditional products, PDOs and PGIs, DOCs and DOCGs in Italy. It is sometimes linked to an enological tour.

This kind of route aims to promote Italian products of excellence in the agricultural field and in food industry, with a special focus on PDO olive oils. Usually it includes frantoi (olive presses), rural hamlets, medieval villages, Reinassance cities, archeological sites, ancient and modern production farms, and thermal locations.

The route may include cultural and landscape paths in the PDO production areas, often interesting from an archeological, historical, artistic, point of view. Special parks allow kids to learn by playing; along food-oil-and-wine paths can be found restaurants, farm stays and suggestions to enjoy food and locations.
Strade dell'olio are often situated in or nearby UNESCO areas and places renowned worldwide for the production of quality wines, cheese and, obviously, oil and olives.

Strade dell'olio are often related to wellness tours, for the numerous thermal areas within DOP production territories.

== PDO Italian Oils and Strade dell'olio ==
N.	Definition (official data Italian Ministry Ministero delle Politiche Agricole, Alimentari e Forestali)	Cat.	Sector	Laws CEE/CE/UE and GUCE/GUUE n°	Region	Province	Strada dell'olio
1	Alto Crotonese	PDO	Oils	Reg. CE n. 1257 del 15.07.03 GUCE L. 177 del 16.07.03	Calabria	Crotone	
2	Aprutino Pescarese	PDO	Oils	Reg. CE n. 1263 del 01.07.96 GUCE L. 163 del 02.07.96	Abruzzo	Pescara	Le strade dell'olio, visitAbruzzo.eu
3	Brisighella	PDO	Oils	Reg. CE n. 1263 del 01.07.96 GUCE L. 163 del 02.07.96	Emilia Romagna	Ravenna, Forlì	
4	Bruzio	PDO	Oils	Reg. CE n. 1065 del 12.06.97 GUCE L. 156 del 13.06.97	Calabria	Cosenza	
5	Canino	PDO	Oils	Reg. CE n. 1263 del 01.07.96 GUCE L. 163 del 02.07.96	Lazio	Viterbo	
6	Cartoceto	PDO	Oils	Reg. CE n. 1897 del 29.10.04 GUCE L. 328 del 30.10.04	Marche	Pesaro-Urbino	
7	Chianti Classico	PDO	Oils	Reg. CE n. 2446 del 06.11.00 GUCE L. 281 del 07.11.00	Toscana	Siena, Firenze	Le strade dell'olio, Toscana
8	Cilento	PDO	Oils	Reg. CE n. 1065 del 12.06.97 GUCE L. 156 del 13.06.97	Campania	Salerno	
9	Collina di Brindisi	PDO	Oils	Reg. CE n. 1263 del 01.07.96 GUCE L. 163 del 02.07.96	Puglia	Brindisi	Le strade dell'olio, Puglia
10	Colline di Romagna	PDO	Oils	Reg. CE n. 1491 del 25.08.03 GUCE L. 214 del 26.08.03	Emilia Romagna	Forlì - Cesena, Rimini	
11	Colline Pontine	PDO	Oils	Reg. UE n. 259 del 25.03.10 GUUE L. 80 del 26.03.10	Lazio	Latina	
12	Colline Salernitane	PDO	Oils	Reg. CE n. 1065 del 12.06.97 GUCE L. 156 del 13.06.97	Campania	Salerno	
13	Colline Teatine	PDO	Oils	Reg. CE n. 1065 del 12.06.97 GUCE L. 156 del 13.06.97	Abruzzo	Chieti	Le strade dell'olio, visitAbruzzoeu
14	Dauno	PDO	Oils	Reg. CE n. 2325 del 24.11.97 GUCE L. 322 del 25.11.97	Puglia	Foggia	Strada dell'olio Dauno
15	Garda	PDO	Oils	Reg. CE n. 2325 del 24.11.97 GUCE L. 322 del 25.11.97	Lombardia, Veneto, Prov. Aut. di Trento	Brescia, Verona, Mantova, Trento	
16	Colline dell'Ufita	PDO	Oils	Reg. UE . 203 del 10.03.10 GUUE L. 61 dell'11.03.10	Campania	Avellino	
17	Laghi Lombardi	PDO	Oils	Reg. CE n. 2325 del 24.11.97 GUCE L. 322 del 25.11.97	Lombardia	Brescia, Bergamo, Como, Lecco	
18	Lametia	PDO	Oils	Reg. CE n. 2107 del 04.10.99 GUCE L. 258 del 05.10.99	Calabria	Catanzaro	
19	Lucca	PDO	Oils	Reg. CE n. 1845 del 22.10.04 GUCE L. 322 del 23.10.04	Toscana	Lucca, Massa Carrara	Strada dell'olio Lucca
20	Molise	PDO	Oils	Reg. CE n. 1257 del 15.07.03 GUCE L. 177 del 16.07.03	Molise	Campobasso, Isernia	
21	Monte Etna	PDO	Oils	Reg. CE n. 1491 del 25.08.03 GUCE L. 214 del 26.08.03	Sicilia	Catania, Enna, Messina	
22	Monti Iblei	PDO	Oils	Reg. CE n. 2325 del 24.11.97, Reg. CE n. 828 del 14.05.03, Reg. UE n. 307 del 14.04.10 GUCE L. 322 del 25.11.97, GUCE L. 120 del 15.05.03, GUUE L. 94 del 15.04.10	Sicilia	Catania, Ragusa, Siracusa	
23	Penisola Sorrentina	PDO	Oils	Reg. CE n. 1065 del 12.06.97 GUCE L. 156 del 13.06.97	Campania	Napoli	
24	Pretuziano delle Colline Teramane	PDO	Oils	Reg. CE n. 1491 del 25.08.03 GUCE L. 214 del 26.08.03	Abruzzo	Teramo	Le strade dell'olio, visitAbruzzo.eu
25	Riviera Ligure	PDO	Oils	Reg. CE n. 123 del 23.01.97 GUCE L. 122 del 24.01.97	Liguria	Imperia, Savona, Genova, La Spezia	Strade dell'olio, RivieraLigure.it
26	Sabina (oil)	PDO	Oils	Reg. CE n. 1263 del 01.07.96, Reg. CE n. 510 del 16.06.09 GUCE L. 163 del 02.07.96, GUCE L. 153 del 17.06.09	Lazio	Roma, Rieti	Strada dell'Olio Sabina
27	Sardegna	PDO	Oils	Reg. CE n. 148 del 15.02.07 GUCE L. 46 del 16.02.07	Sardegna	Cagliari, Nuoro, Oristano, Sassari, Carbonia-Iglesias, Medio Campidano, Ogliastra, Olbia-Tempio	
28	Tergeste	PDO	Oils	Reg. CE n. 1845 del 22.10.04 GUCE L. 322 del 23.10.04	Friuli Venezia Giulia	Trieste	
29	Terra di Bari	PDO	Oils	Reg. CE n. 2325 del 24.11.97 GUCE L. 322 del 25.11.97	Puglia	Taranto, Brindisi, Lecce	Le strade dell'olio, Puglia
30	Terra d'Otranto	PDO	Oils	Reg. CE n. 644 del 20.03.98 GUCE L. 87 del 21.03.98	Puglia	Bari	Le strade dell'olio, Puglia
31	Terre di Siena	PDO	Oils	Reg. CE n. 2446 del 06.11.00 GUCE L. 281 del 07.11.00	Toscana	Siena	Le strade dell'olio, Toscana
32	Terre Tarentine	PDO	Oils	Reg. CE n. 1898 del 29.10.04 GUCE L. 328 del 30.10.04	Puglia	Taranto	Le strade dell'olio, Puglia
33	Tuscia	PDO	Oils	Reg. CE n. 1623 del 4.10.05 GUCE L. 259 del 5.10.05	Lazio	Viterbo	
34	Umbria	PDO	Oils	Reg. CE n. 2325 del 24.11.97 GUCE L. 322 del 25.11.97	Umbria	Perugia, Terni	Strada dell'olio DOP Umbria
35	Val di Mazara	PDO	Oils	Reg. CE n. 138 del 24.01.01 GUCE L. 23 del 25.01.01	Sicilia	Palermo, Agrigento	
36	Valdemone	PDO	Oils	Reg. CE n. 205 del 4.02.05 GUCE L. 33 del 5.02.05	Sicilia	Messina	Strada dell'olio Valdemone
37	Valle del Belice	PDO	Oils	Reg. CE n. 1486 del 20.08.04 GUCE L. 273 del 21.08.04	Sicilia	Trapani	
38	Valli Trapanesi	PDO	Oils	Reg. CE n. 2325 del 24.11.97 GUCE L. 322 del 25.11.97	Sicilia	Trapani	
39	Valpolicella, Colli Euganei, Colli Berici, Monte Grappa	PDO	Oils	Reg. CE n. 2036 del 17.10.01 GUCE L. 275 del 18.10.01	Veneto	Verona, Padova, Vicenza, Treviso	

== See also ==
- Appellation
- Country of origin
- European Union Common Agricultural Policy
- Genericized trademark
- Geographical indication
- Italian cuisine
- Italian wines
- List of geographical designations for spirit drinks in the European Union
- List of Italian cheeses
- List of Italian DOC wines
- List of Italian DOCG wines
- List of Italian products with protected designation of origin
- Protected Geographical Status
- Quality Wines Produced in Specified Regions (QWPSR)
