= Échallod Bridge =

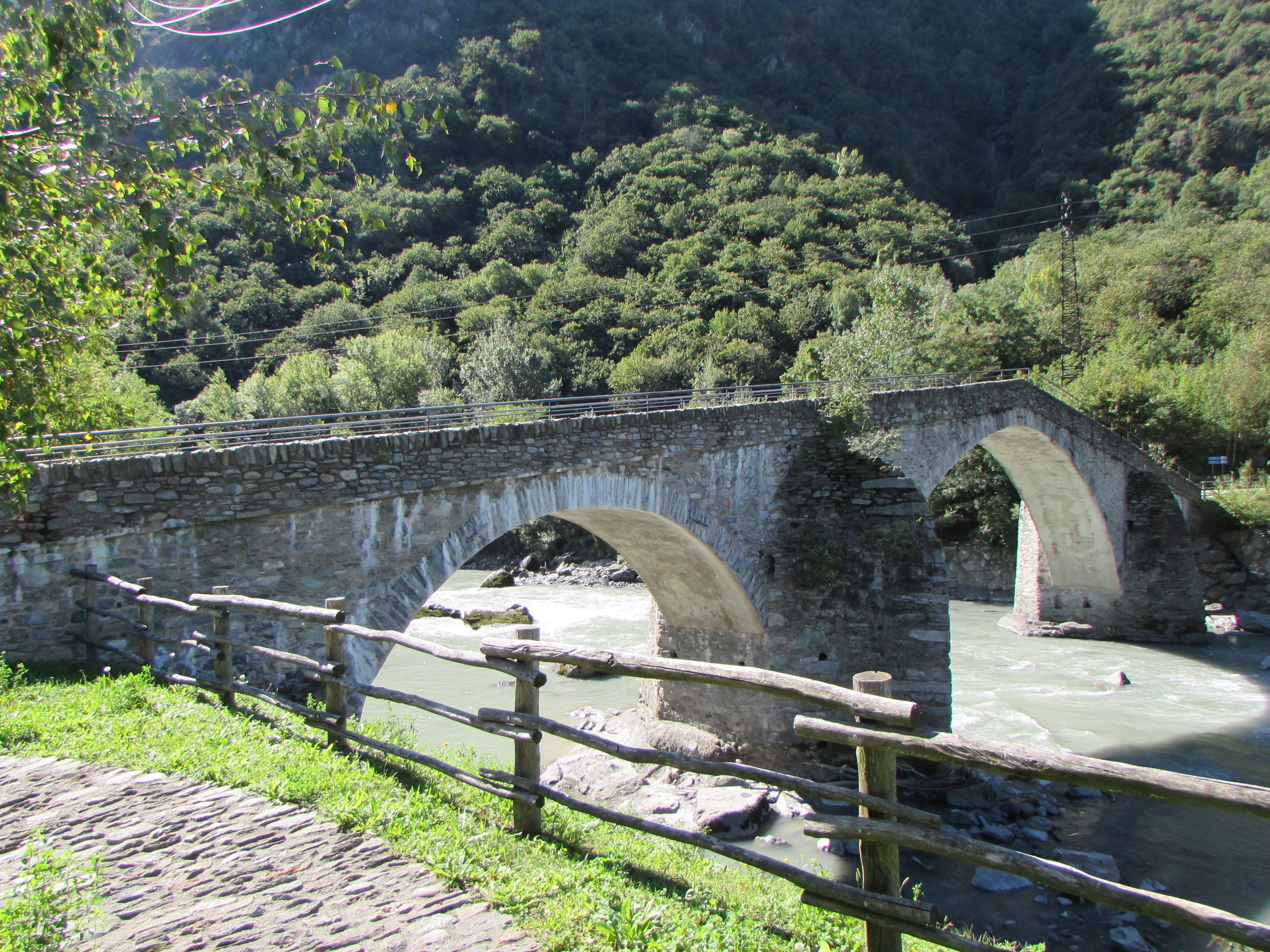
- Coordinates: 45.635614°N 7.717487°E
- Crosses: Dora Baltea
- Locale: Arnad, Italy

Characteristics
- Design: stone humpbacked arch bridge

The Échallod Bridge (Italian: Ponte di Échallod; French: pont d'Échallod) is a stone arch bridge over the Dora Baltea near Échallod in Arnad, Italy.

== History ==
The bridge was built between 1770 and 1776 and has undergone multiple renovation works over the centuries.

== Description ==
The bridge features a symmetrical humpback design and rests on three arches supported by sturdy buttresses. On the right shoulder, there is a shrine built to protect travelers.
