= Canestrato =

Italian cheese

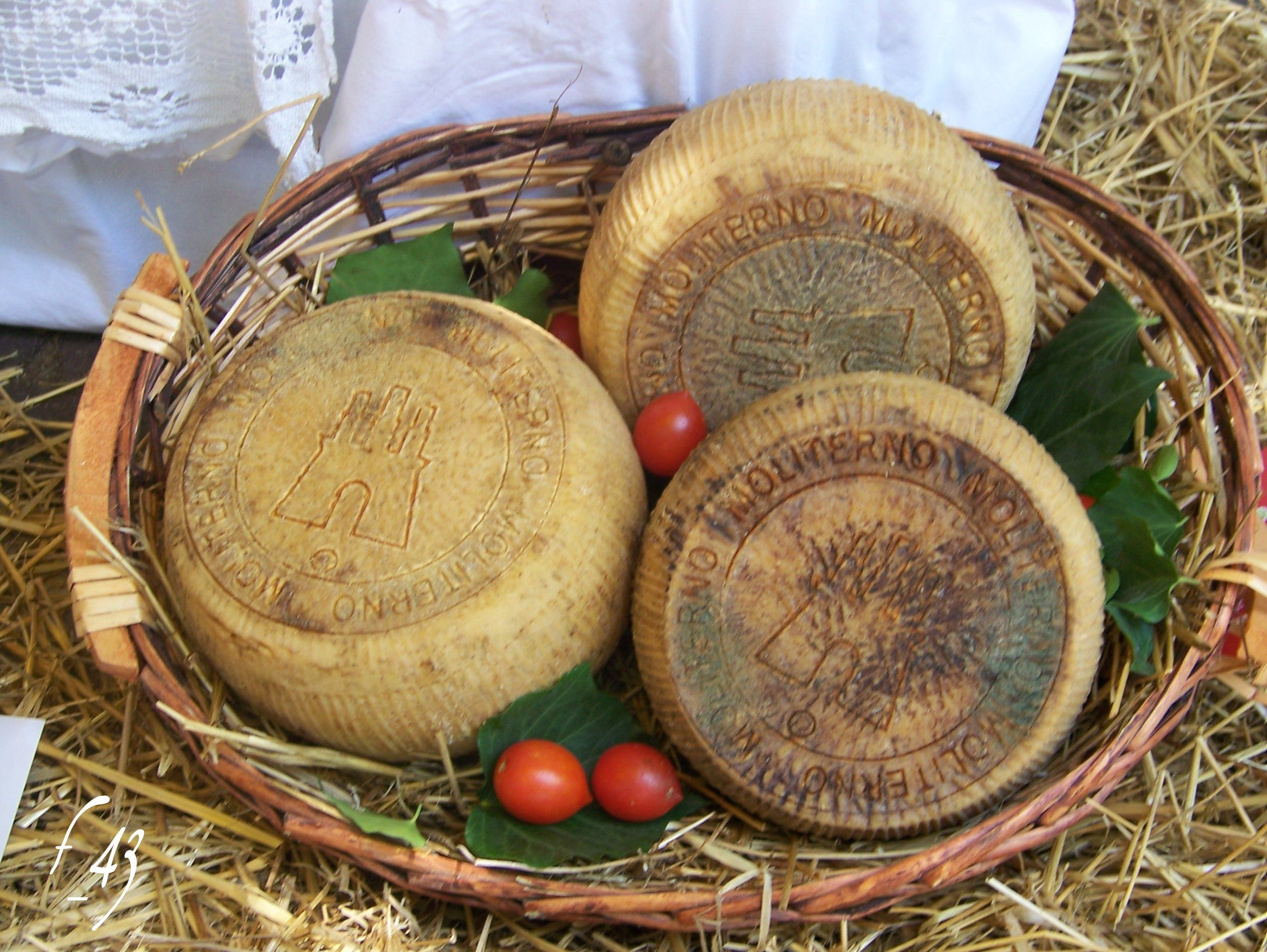
Canestrato from Moliterno, on the list of Italian products with protected designation of origin

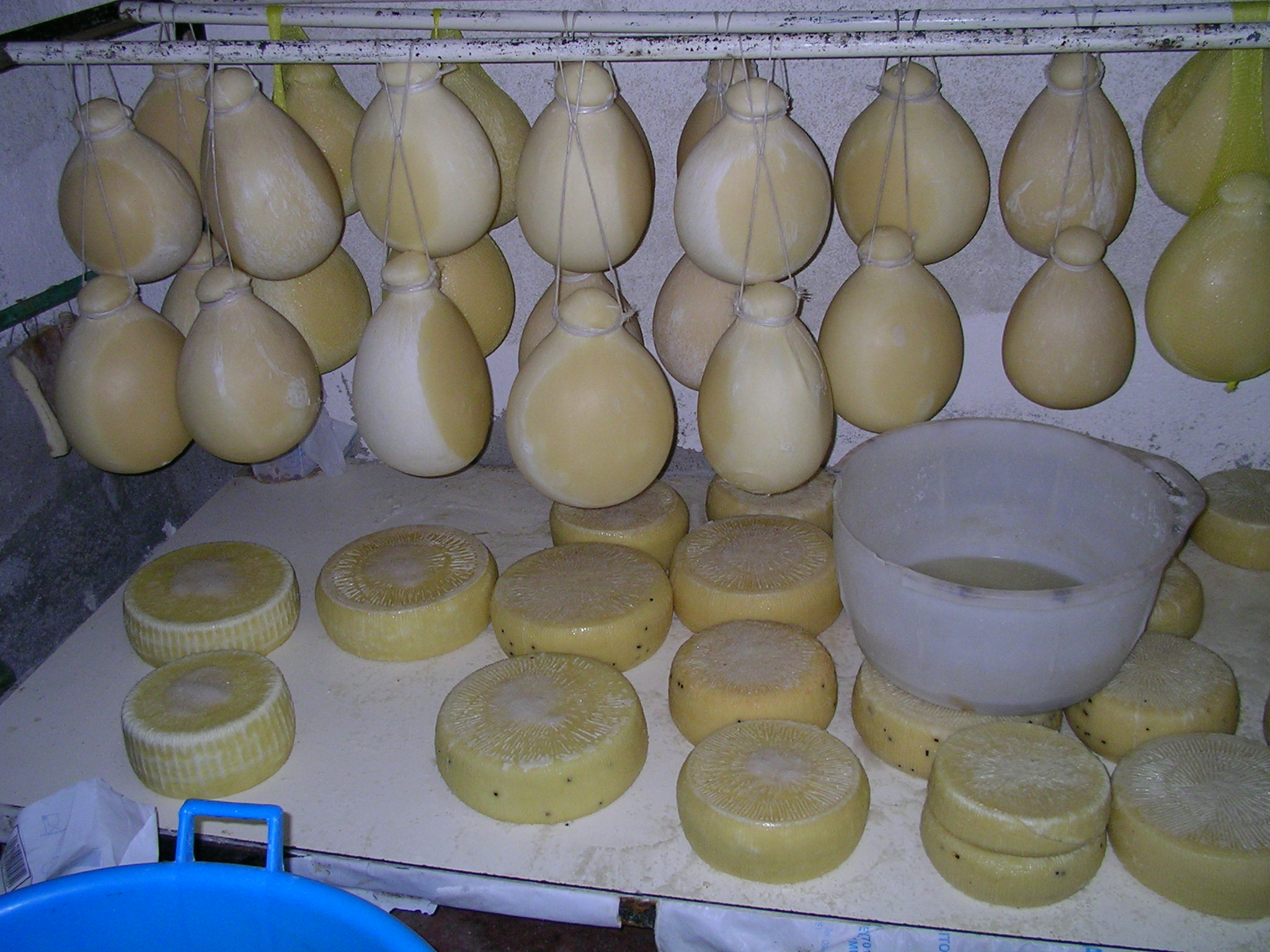
Cylinders of Canestrato al pepe below from Nebrodi (Messina) below hanging provolone

Canestrato is a hard cheese from the Italian regions of Basilicata, Apulia, Sicily, and Abruzzo, made from a mixture of sheep milk and goat milk. It is listed on the Ark of Taste. The cheese is typical in Basilicata. It is also a specialty of Castel del Monte, Abruzzo. The Apulian variety is made using Levilactobacillus brevis.

Canestrato varietals include:

- Canestrato of Castel del Monte, Abruzzo
- Canestrato di Moliterno, a hard mixed sheep's and goats' milk cheese from Basilicata. It is matured for at least sixty days and may be eaten at table or grated. An application for PGI status was registered in 2010.
- Canestrato pugliese Puglia, a PDO cheese made in the province of Foggia.
- Canestrato trentino

== See also ==
- List of Italian cheeses
