= Arnad =

Arnad Arnà (Valdôtain) Arnoal (Walser)
- Comune
- Comune di Arnad; Commune d'Arnad
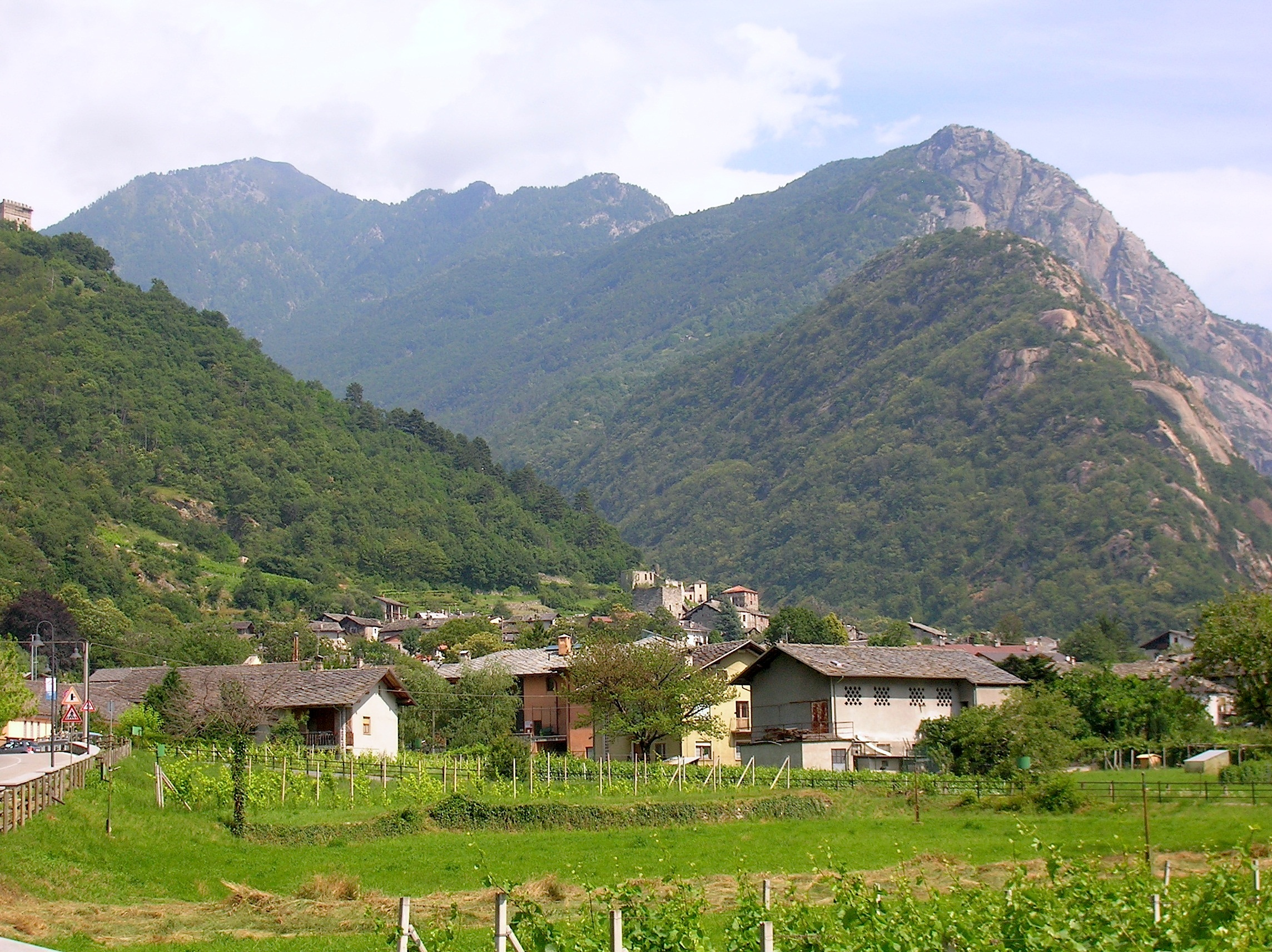

- Coat of arms

- Location of Arnad in Italy Arnad (Aosta Valley)
- Coordinates: 45°38′N 7°43′E
- Country: Italy
- Region: Aosta Valley
- Frazioni: Anvyey, Arnad-Le-Vieux, Bonavesse, Champagnolaz, Château, Chez Fornelle, Clapey, Clos de Barme, Costa, Échallod, Échallogne, Extraz, Les Vachères, Machaby, Pied-de-Ville, Prouve, Revie, Rolléty, Sisan, Torrettaz, Ville

Government
  - Mayor: Alexandre Bertolin

Area
  - Total: 28.84 km^{2} (11.14 sq mi)
- Elevation: 361 m (1,184 ft)

Population (31 December 2022)
  - Total: 1,230
  - Density: 42.6/km^{2} (110/sq mi)
- Demonym: Arnadins
- Time zone: UTC+1 (CET)
  - Summer (DST): UTC+2 (CEST)
- Postal code: 11020
- Dialing code: 0125
- Patron saint: St. Martin of Tours
- Saint day: 11 November
- Website: Official website

Arnad (French: [aʁna]; Arpitan: Arnà; Issime Walser: Arnoal); is a town and comune in the Aosta Valley region of northwestern Italy.

== See also ==
- Vallée d'Aoste Lard d'Arnad
