= Vallée d'Aoste Lard d'Arnad =

Cured pork product from Italy

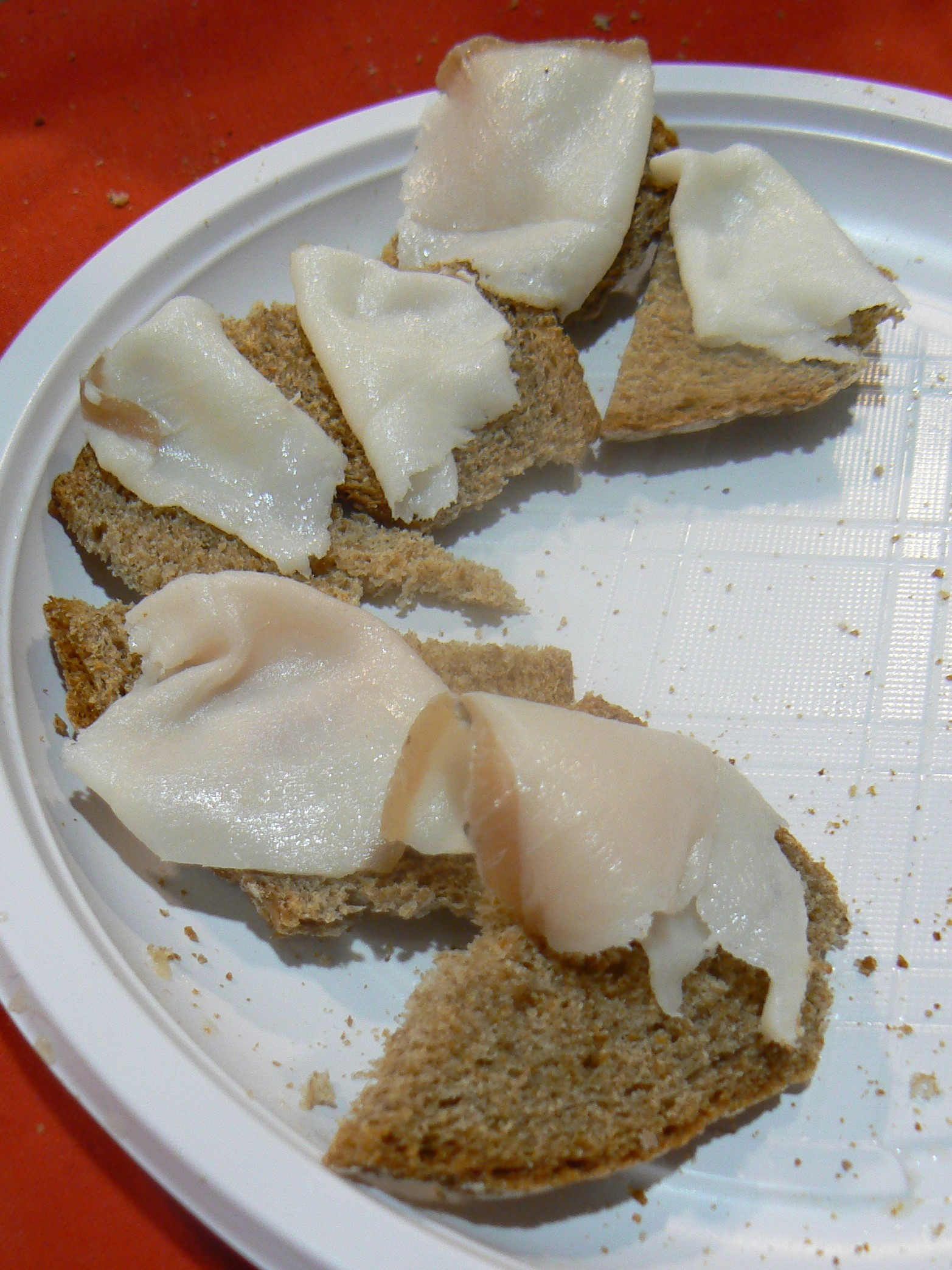
Vallée d’Aoste Lard d'Arnad.

Vallée d’Aoste Lard d'Arnad is a variety of lardo (a cured pork product) produced exclusively within the municipal boundaries of the comune (municipality) of Arnad, in the lower Aosta Valley, Italy. In 1996, it was recognised as a protected designation of origin (PDO) by the European Union and is promoted by the Comité pour la valorisation des produits typiques d'Arnad - Lo Doil producers association.

== Description ==
The lard, one of a number of preserved meat specialties of the region, is produced by curing pieces of fatback in a brine aromatised with herbs and spices such as juniper berry, bay leaf, nutmeg, sage, and rosemary. The brining takes place in wooden tubs known as doïls, which may be made of chestnut, oak or larch, and are used solely for this purpose; it is known that Vallée d'Aoste Lard d'Arnad has been made for more than two centuries, since a 1763 inventory from Arnad Castle refers to four doïls which belonged to its kitchens. It is often eaten with black bread and honey.

The traditional Féhta dou lar (Arnad Francoprovençal patois for 'Lard Festival') is a sagra held each year on the last Sunday of August. It has become a significant tourist attraction.

== See also ==
- Lardo
