= Lardo =

Italian cured and seasoned strips of pig fat

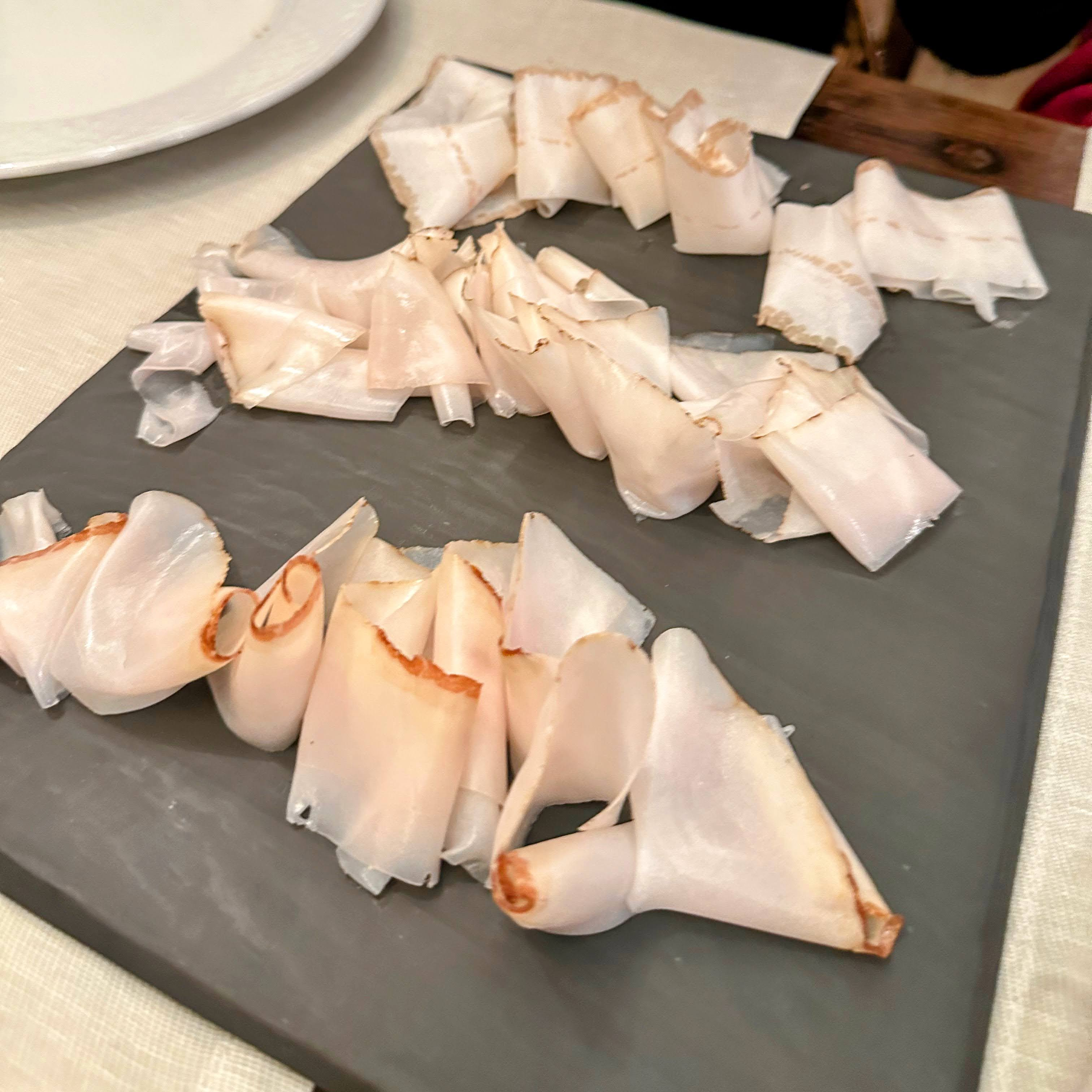
Three types of lardo, thinly sliced

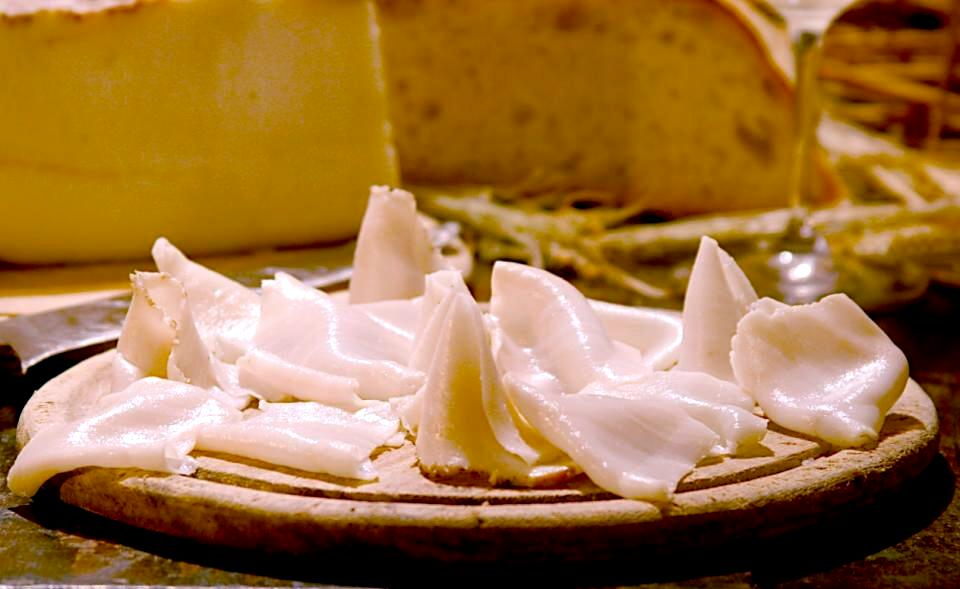
Lardo di Colonnata

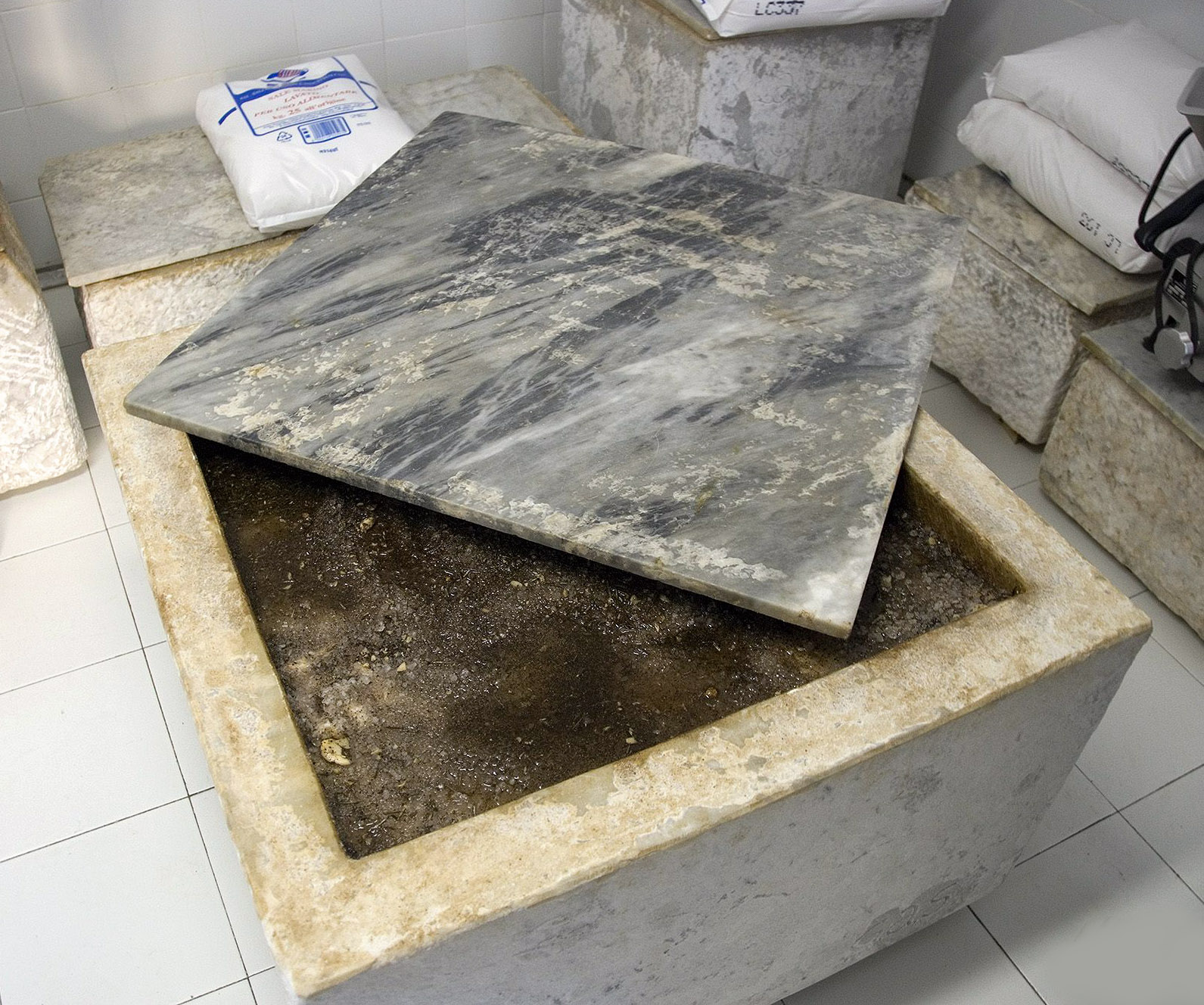
Marble basin for curing lardo di Colonnata

Lardo is a type of salume made by curing strips of fatback with salt, rosemary, and other herbs and spices.

The most famous lardo is from the Colonnata, Tuscany, where lardo has been made since Roman times. Colonnata is a frazione (hamlet) of the city of Carrara, which is famous for its marble; traditionally lardo is cured for months in basins made of Carrara marble, which is quarried in Colonnata. Lardo di Colonnata is included in the Ark of Taste catalog of heritage foods and has been a protected geographical indication (PGI) since 2004.

Lardo is composed of over 90% lipids and 3–5% salt.

== See also ==
- Vallée d'Aoste Lard d'Arnad
