= Pomodoro di Pachino =

Variety of tomato

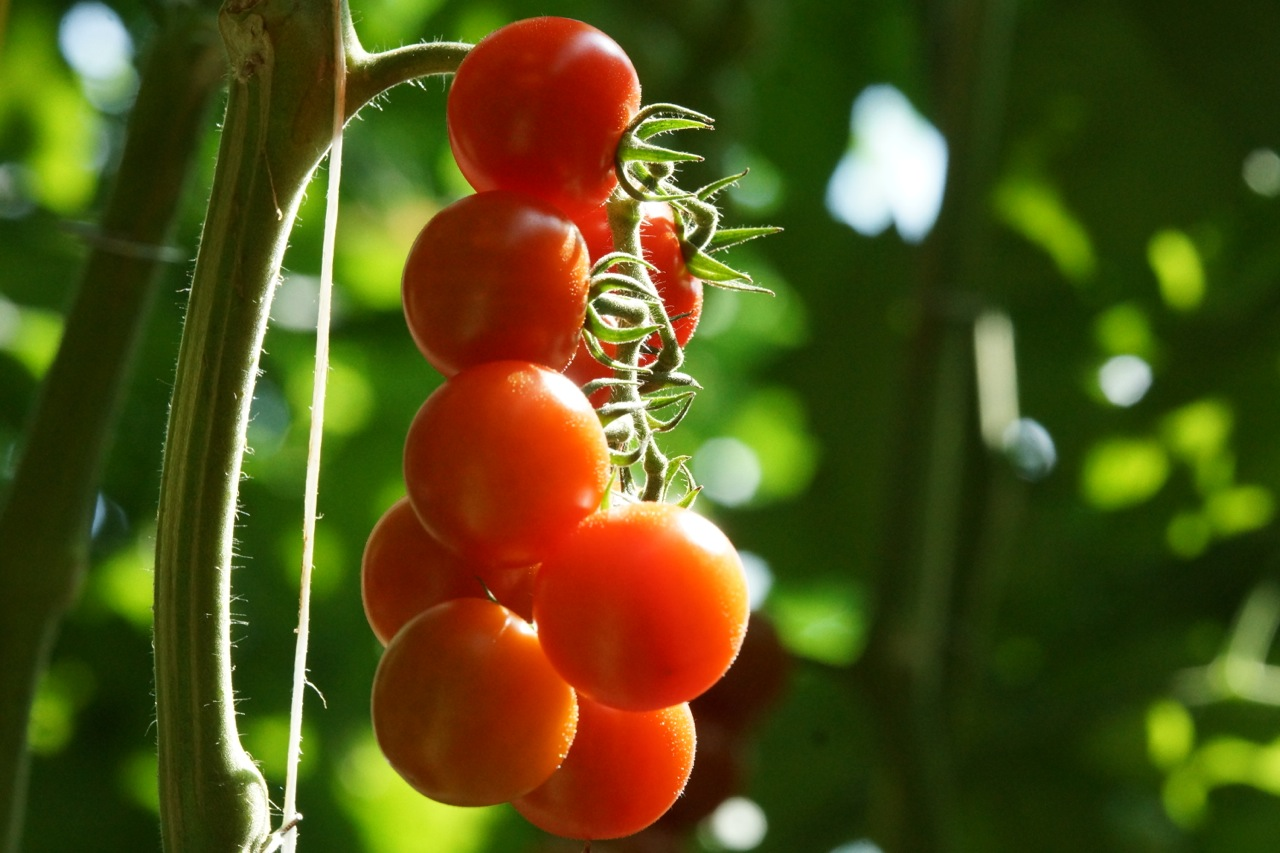
Pomodori di Pachino

Pomodoro di Pachino (Italian: [pomoˈdɔːro di paˈkiːno]) is a protected geographical indication (PGI) for tomatoes from the southeast coast of Sicily, Italy, granted by the EU since 2003.

== Origin ==
According to Corriere della Sera it is not Italian at all but is actually a variety created in Israel by the multinational HaZera Genetics, that was introduced in Italy in 1989.

== Varieties ==
The four varieties allowed within the classification include both cherry tomatoes and costoluto tomatoes, and are:

- Ciliegino (cherry)
- Costoluto (large salad tomato; similar to a beefsteak tomato)
- Tondo liscio (round and smooth)
- Grappolo ('grape' tomato)

== Area allowed for cultivation ==
Under the classification, the zone of production lies within the area bordered by Noto to the north, Portopalo di Capo Passero to the south, both in Syracuse, and Ispica (Ragusa) to the west.

== See also ==
- List of tomato cultivars
