= Aprutino pescarese =

Olive oil produced in the province of Pescara, Abruzzo

Aprutino pescarese is a protected designation of origin (PDO) olive oil produced in the province of Pescara, Abruzzo. It is among the first group of Italian extra virgin olive oils to gain the PDO.

== Cultivar ==
- Dritta
- Leccino
- Toccolana

== Organoleptic traits ==
Aprutino pescarese has the following traits:

- Color: green to yellow;
- Odor: middle-high fruity;
- Taste: fruity;
- Oleic acid: max. acidity not exceeding 0,6 g per 100 g of oil;
- Panel Test score: ≥ 6.5;
- Number of peroxides: ≤ 14 mEq O2/kg;
- K270: ≤ 1.50;
- Oleic acid: 68.00% and 85.00%;
- Polyphenols: ≥ 100 p.p.m.

== See also ==
- Olive oil
- Olive oil regulation and adulteration
