= Bruzio =

Geographically protected olive oil

Bruzio olive oil is a Protected Designation of Origin (PDO) product, as of European regulation Reg. CEE 2081/92 and Reg. CE n.1065/97. Bruzio Extra Virgin Olive Oil has a fruity taste and aroma. It is green with light yellowish highlights, and has max acidity of 0.8%. Bruzio olive oil goes perfectly with barbecued fish, boiled vegetables or traditional Calabrian dishes.

== Production ==
Bruzio oil is extracted from wholesome olives, harvested in the Southern territories of the Province of Cosenza. Physical and mechanical processes that keep the original characteristics of the olives are used. After harvesting mature olives and pressing them, the wholesome olives are selected from all the olives harvested. These selected olives are then cleaned and defoiled, followed by them undergoing cleansing, milling, kneading and separation.

== Preservation ==
Bruzio oil has to be preserved in dry and cool places, and has to be kept away from heat sources. Temperature has to be kept under control between 14° and 20°C, to keep unaltered its qualities for 36 or more months. Low temperatures can cause the oil to freeze; if that happens, the case of Bruzio oil will have to be heated back to room temperature, so as for it to be consumable once again.
