= List of English cheeses =

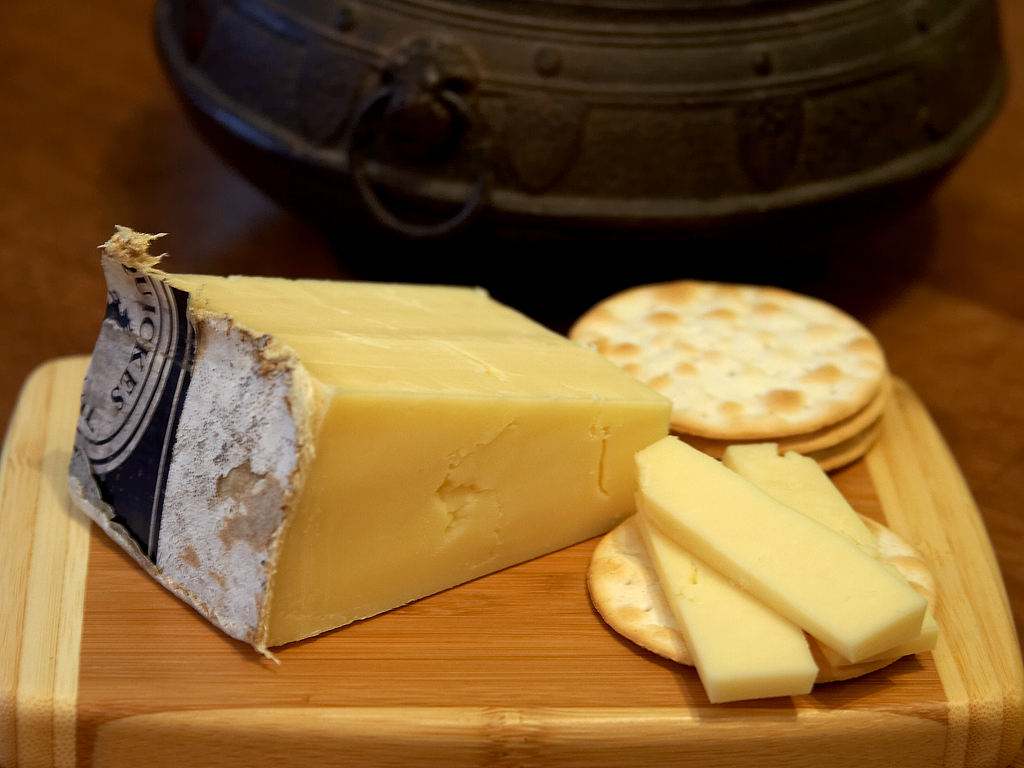
Cheddar cheese with crackers

This is a list of notable cheeses in English cuisine. Some sources claim that at least 927 varieties of cheese are produced in England. Fourteen English cheeses are classified as protected designation of origin.

In English cuisine, foods such as cheese have ancient origins. The 14th-century English cookery book The Forme of Cury (Note: Cury here means cooking, related to French cuire, to cook.) contains recipes for these, and dates from the royal court of Richard II.

== English cheeses ==
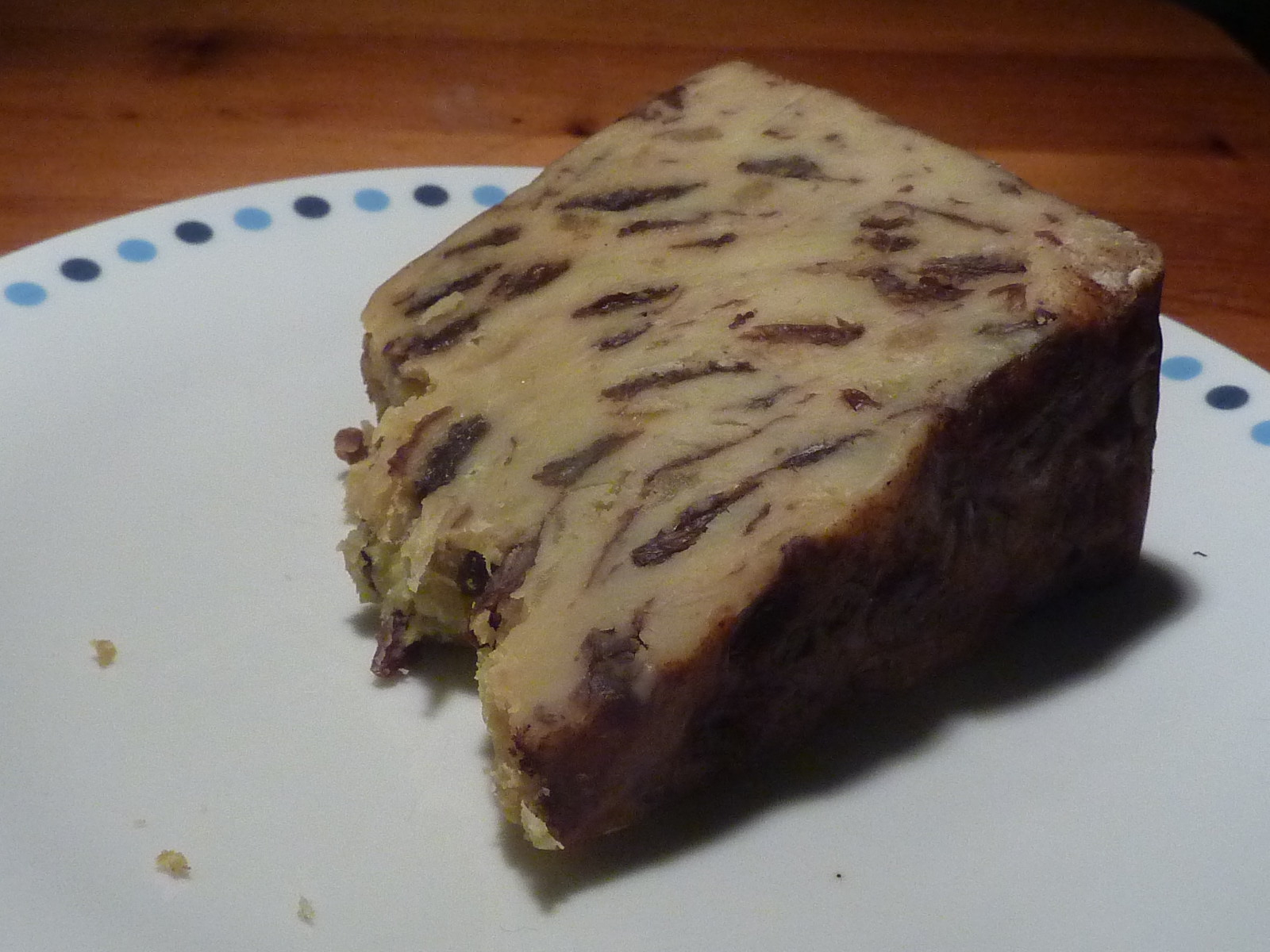
A wedge of Bowland cheese

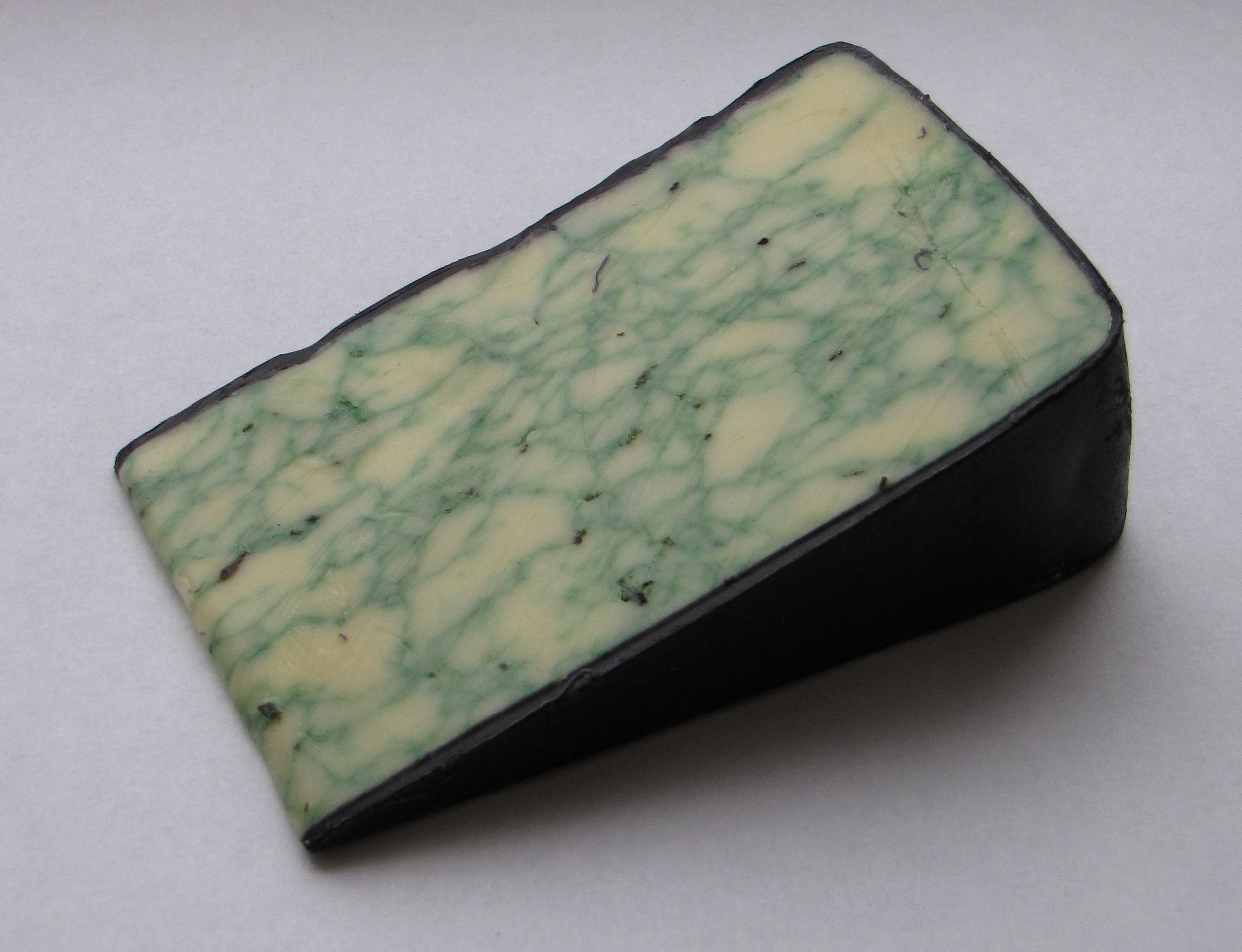
Derby cheese varieties include Sage Derby, shown with a wax coating

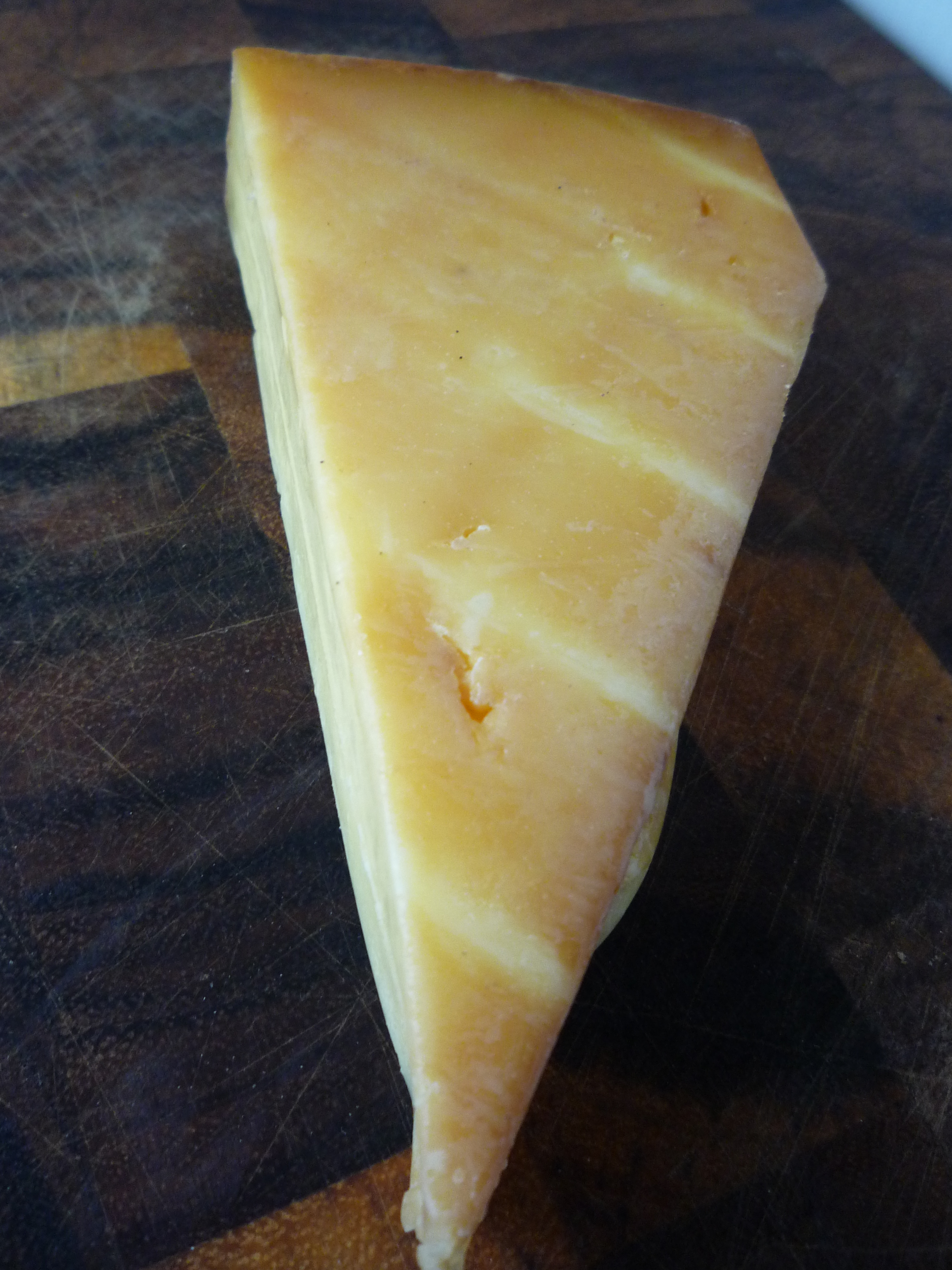
Smoked Lincolnshire Poacher cheese

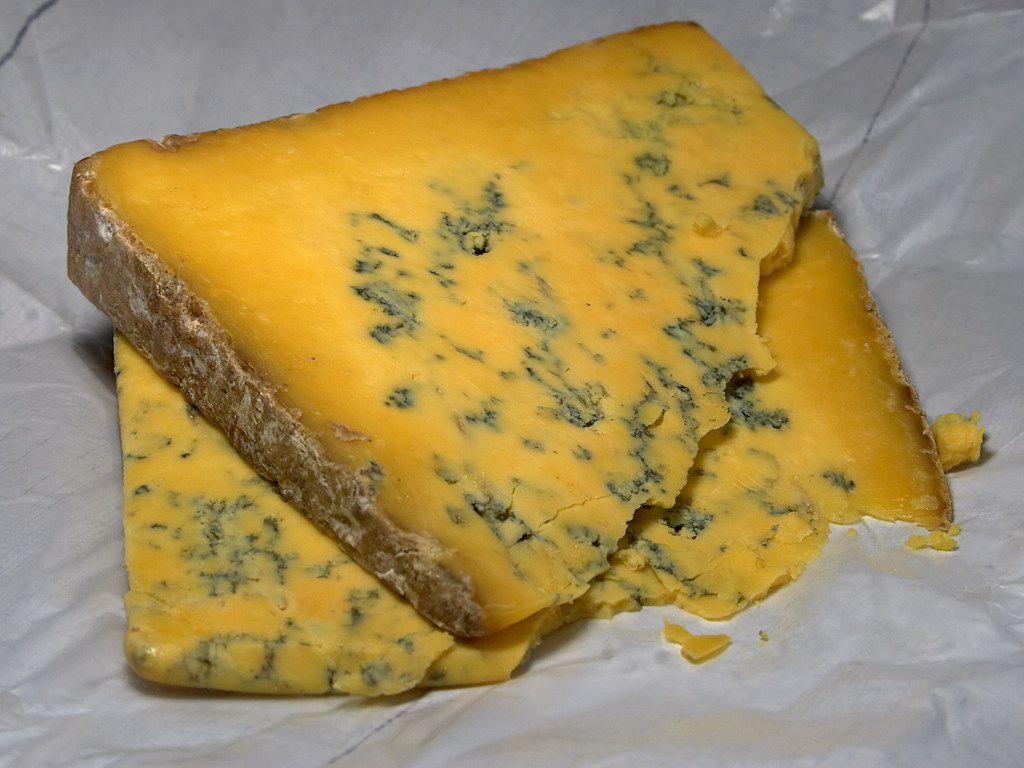
Shropshire Blue

- Applewood cheese – Type of smoke-flavoured cheese
- Ashdown Foresters – Type of cheese
- Bath Blue
- Bath Soft Cheese
- Beacon Fell Traditional Lancashire Cheese – Protected designation of origin UK cheese
- Beenleigh Blue cheese – Soft blue cheese
- Berkswell – Type of British cheese
- Blue Stilton – English type of cheese
- Bowland cheese
- Brighton Blue – Blue cheese made in Sussex, England
- Buxton Blue – British cheese
- Cheddar – Hard cheese
- Cheshire – Cheese from Cheshire, England
- Chevington – Cow's milk cheese made in Northumberland, England
- Colwick – Village and civil parish in Nottinghamshire, England
- Coquetdale – English type of cheese
- Cornish Blue – British cheese
- Cornish Brie – Type of British cheese from Cornwall, England
- Cornish Yarg – Cornish semi-hard cheese
- Coverdale, named after the valley of that name in the Yorkshire Dales
- Croglin – Village in Cumbria, England
- Davidstow Cheddar – Brand of Cheddar cheese from Cornwall
- Derby – English cheese
- Dorset Blue Vinney – British blue cow's milk cheese
- Dorset Drum – English cheese
- Dovedale cheese – British blue cheese from the Peak District
- Duddleswell cheese – Type of cheese made in England
- Fine Fettle Yorkshire – British cheese similar to feta
- Gevrik
- Gloucester – English semi-hard cheese
- Harbourne Blue – Brand of British goat cheese
- Hereford Hop – English cheese
- Keltic Gold – Semi-hard cheese from Cornwall, UK
- Lancashire – English cheese
- Lincolnshire Poacher cheese – English hard cheese
- Little Derby – English cheese
- Lymeswold cheese – English cheese
- Marble cheese – Cheese type characterized by streaks of different colors
- Merry Wyfe (Bath)
- Norbury Blue – English blue cheese
- Old Winchester
- Oxford Blue (cheese) – Blue cheese produced in Oxfordshire, England
- Parlick Fell cheese – Sheep's milk cheese from Lancashire, England
- Red Leicester – English hard cheese similar to Cheddar
- Red Windsor – Semi-hard English cheese
- Renegade Monk – Artisan blue cheese made in England
- Sage Derby – Variety of cheese
- Shropshire Blue – Scottish cheese
- Stichelton – Variety of Stilton cheese using unpasteurised milk
- Stilton – English type of cheese
  - Blue Stilton
  - White Stilton
- Stinking Bishop – English semi-soft cheese
- St James Cheese
- Suffolk Gold – Semi-soft cheese
- Suffolk Bang – Type of cheese produced in Suffolk, England
- Sussex Slipcote – English cheese
- Swaledale – English hard cheese made in North Yorkshire
- Tesyn – Cultured products of milk of domestic goats
- Waterloo cheese – English semi-soft cheese
- Wensleydale – English cheese
- Wyfe of Bath – English semi-hard cows' milk cheese

== See also ==
- List of cheeses
- List of British cheeses
- List of Cornish cheeses
- List of English dishes
