= Geographically indicated foods of the United Kingdom =

There are many geographically indicated foods of the United Kingdom. In British cuisine, there is a custom of naming foodstuffs with reference to their place of origin. However, there are other reasons for this practice; Scotch egg, which was invented in London and Dover sole which indicates where they were landed, for example.

A number of such foods have been granted Protected Geographical Status under European Union law (see List of United Kingdom food and drink products with protected status).

== A ==
- Aberdeen roll
- Allerdale Cheese
- Angus burger
- Arbroath smokie

== B ==
- Bakewell pudding
- Bakewell tart
- Banbury apple pie
- Banbury cake
- Barkham Blue and Barkham Chase (cheeses)
- Bath blue (cheese)
- Bath bun
- Bath chap
- Bath Oliver biscuit
- Bedfordshire clanger (pastry)
- Belvoir Castle buns
- Berkshire jugged steak
- Berwick cockle (sweet/candy)
- Blenheim Orange (apple)
- Blue Wensleydale (cheese)
- Bonchester cheese
- (Scottish) Border tart
- Borrowdale teabread
- Branston pickle
- Brown Windsor soup
- Buxton Blue cheese

== C ==
- Caerphilly cheese
- Cheddar cheese
- Chelsea bun
- Cheshire cheese
- Cheshire soup
- Coleraine cheddar
- Colchester Native Oysters
- Chorley cake
- Cornish clotted cream
- Cornish fairings (biscuits/cookies)
- Cornish Gilliflower (apple)
- Cornish pasty
- Cornish sardines
- Cornish Yarg (cheese)
- Craster kippers
- Cullen skink (soup)
- Cumberland currant and apple pasties
- Cumberland pie
- Cumberland sand cake
- Cumberland spare rib pie and sweet lamb pie
- Cumberland sausage
- Cumberland sauce

== D ==
- Derbyshire fruit loaf
- Derbyshire medley pie
- Derbyshire oatcakes
- Devonshire mullet pie, onion pie, and pork pie
- Devonshire squab pie
- Durham rabbit pot pie
- Devonshire splits
- Devonshire clotted cream
- Dorset Blue Vinney cheese
- Dorset Drum (cheese)
- Dorset fair gingerbread, luxury applecake, rough cake, and tea bread
- Double Gloucester (cheese)
- Dovedale cheese
- Dundee cake
- Dunlop cheese
- Dunsyre Blue (cheese)

== E ==
- Eccles cake
- Essex meat layer pudding
- Essex Pippin (apple)
- Eton mess (dessert)

== F ==
- Fine Fettle Yorkshire Cheese
- Finnan haddie (Findon or Findhorn) fish
- Five Counties cheese
- Flower of Kent (apple)
- Forfar bridie (pasty)

== G ==
- Grasmere gingerbread
- Glamorgan sausage
- Gloucester cheese stew
- Gloucester pancakes
- Goosnargh cake
- Glory of York
- Grimsby smoked fish

== H ==
- Hampshire haslet (meatloaf)
- Harwich Kitchels (pastries)
- Hawick Balls (sweets/candy)
- Hereford apple dumplings
- Hereford Hop

== I ==
- Ipswich almond pudding
- Ipswich lemon pie
- Isle of Wight doughnuts

== J ==
- Jethart snails
- Jersey Royal potato

== K ==
- Kendal mint cake (candy)
- Kentish cheese and apple pie
- Kelvedon Wonder Pea
- Kirriemuir Ginger Bread

== L ==
- Lanark Blue (cheese)
- Lancashire cheese
- (Lancashire) Hindle Wakes (chicken dish)
- Lancashire hotpot (stew)
- Leicester pudding
- Lincoln biscuit
- Lincolnshire Poacher (cheese)
- Lincolnshire sausage
- Little Derby (cheese)
- London bun

== M ==
- Maidstone biscuit
- Malvern pudding
- Manchester tart
- Manx Queenie (shellfish)
- Marauding Scot (dessert)
- Melton Mowbray pork pie
- Merseyside meat pie
- Moffat toffee

== N ==
- Newmarket sausage
- Norbury blue (cheese)
- Norfolk dumplings
- Norfolk plough pudding
- Northamptonshire cheese cake
- Nottingham pudding

== O ==
- Oxford marmalade
- Oxford sausage

== P ==
- Pontefract cakes

== R ==
- Red Leicester cheese
- Red Windsor cheese

== S ==
- Sage Derby cheese
- Sandwich
- Scotch pancake
- Scotch pie
- Scotch broth
- Scotch egg
- Scotch woodcock (egg dish)
- Selkirk bannock (bread)
- Shrewsbury cake
- Shropshire blue (cheese)
- Shropshire fidget pie
- Single Gloucester (cheese)
- Somerset Brie (cheese)
- Somerset Camembert (cheese)
- Somerset chicken
- Staffordshire beef steaks
- Staffordshire cheese
- Staffordshire oatcake
- Stichelton (cheese)
- Stilton cheese
- Stornoway black pudding
- Strathdon Blue (cheese)
- Suffolk buns
- Suffolk cakes
- Suffolk swimmers (dumplings)
- Suffolk fish pie
- Suffolk harvest cake
- Suffolk raisin roly-poly (dessert)
- Suffolk red cabbage
- Suffolk stew
- Surrey lamb pie
- Sussex Pond Pudding (dessert)
- Swaledale cheese

== T ==
- Tewkesbury mustard
- Tintern (cheese)
- Tottenham cake
- Tymsboro' (Timsbury) (cheese)
- Tyneside floddies (breakfast dish)

== W ==
- Welsh cake
- Welsh dragon pork sausage
- Welsh rabbit or rarebit (toast dish)
- Wensleydale cheese
- Worcester pearmain (apple)
- Worcestershire sauce

== Y ==
- Y Fenni (Abergavenny) cheese
- Yorkshire blue (cheese)
- Yorkshire Forced Rhubarb
- Yorkshire pudding (roast dinner accompaniment)
