= List of British cheeses =

UK-made cheeses listed by type

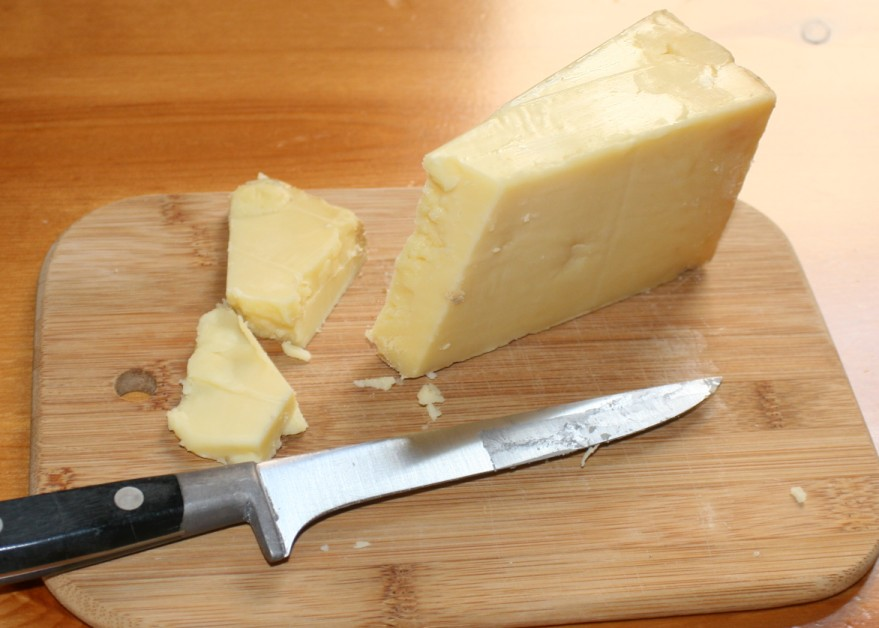
A wedge of unpasteurised West Country Cheddar cheese, made in Somerset (with Protected Designation of Origin)

This is a list of cheeses from the United Kingdom. The British Cheese Board (now part of Dairy UK) states that "there are over 700 named British cheeses produced in the UK." British cheese has become an important export of the UK.

== Blue cheeses ==
Blue cheese is a general classification of cow's milk, sheep's milk, or goat's milk cheeses that have had cultures of the mould Penicillium added so that the final product is spotted or veined throughout with blue, blue-grey or blue-green mould, and carries a distinct savour, either from the mould or various specially cultivated bacteria.

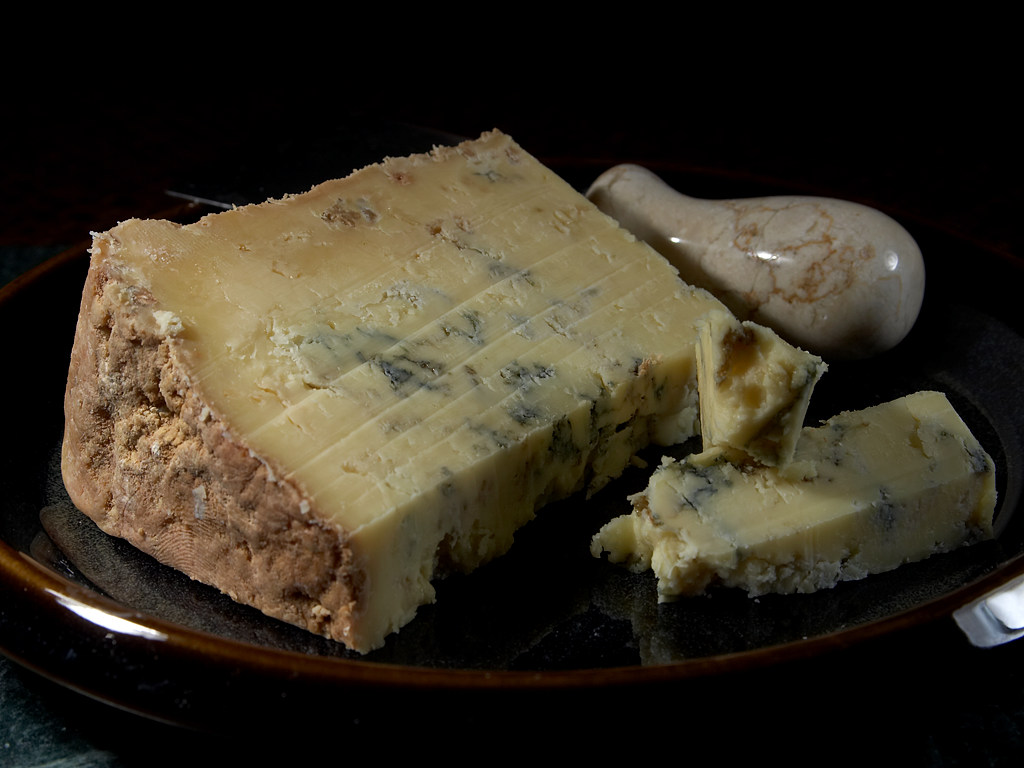
Dorset Blue Vinney

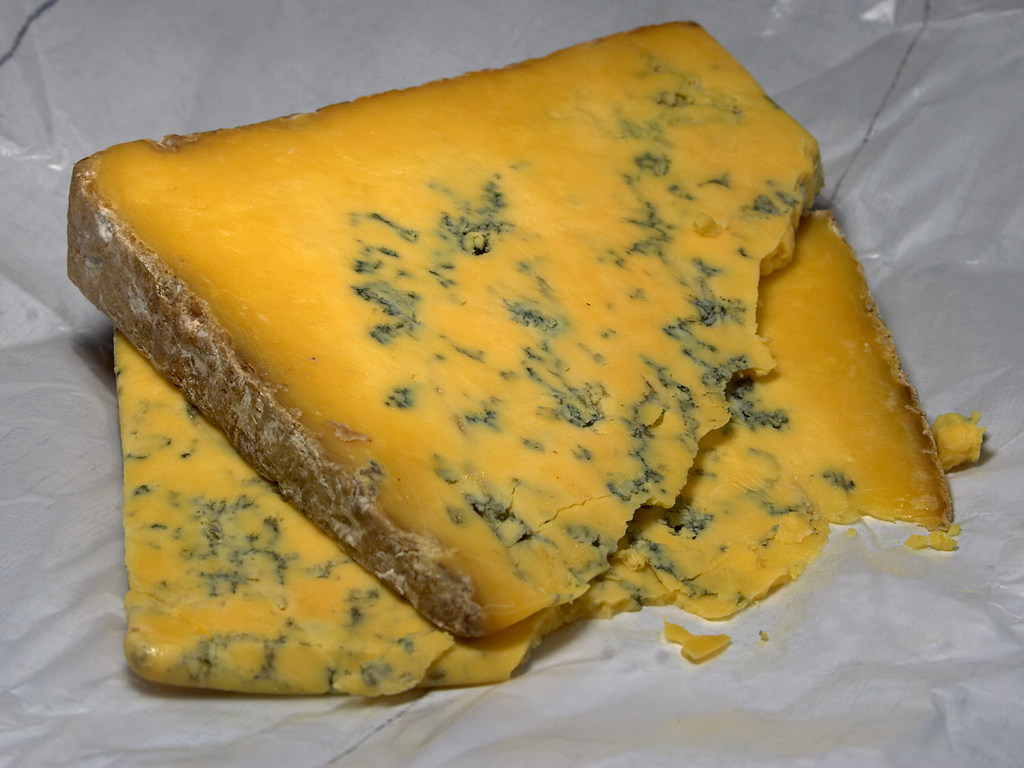
Shropshire Blue

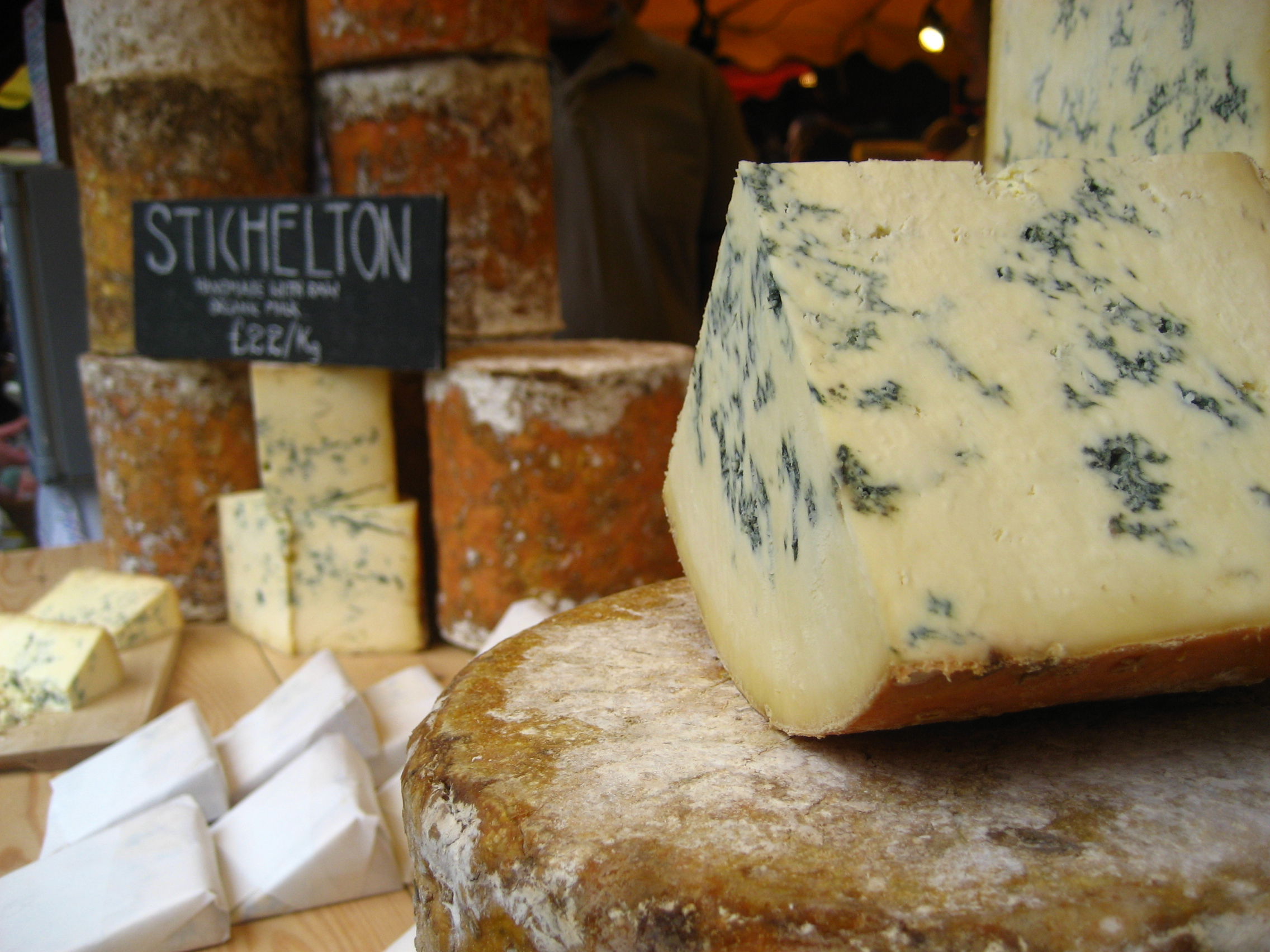
Stichelton

- Barkham Blue – creamy and rich blue cheese with a mouldy rind.
- Beenleigh Blue – thin-rinded, unpressed soft blue cheese made from organic unpasteurised ewe's milk produced in Ashprington, Devon County, England.
- Birdwood Blue Heaven
- Blacksticks Blue
- Blissful Blue Buffalo
- Blue Monday – named after the song by New Order, it is a cube-shaped cheese.
- Brighton Blue – mellow creamy blue cheese using cow milk
- Buxton Blue (Protected Designation of Origin, currently produced by Hartington Creamery, Derbyshire)
- Cheshire Blue
- Cornish Blue – from Cornwall in the United Kingdom, and is made by the Cornish Cheese Company at Upton Cross.
- Devon Blue – a creamy blue cheese made by the Ticklemore Cheese Company using pasteurised cows milk, it is aged for four months.
- Dorset Blue Vinney (Protected Geographical Indication) – a traditional blue cheese made near Sturminster Newton in Dorset, England, from skimmed cows' milk. It is a hard, crumbly cheese.
- Dovedale (Protected Designation of Origin) – a full-fat semi-soft blue-veined cheese made from cow's milk, produced in the Peak District.
- Exmoor Blue (Protected Geographical Indication)
- Harbourne Blue – has a crumby, dense and firm texture with 48% fat content. It is a goat's cheese produced by Robin Congdon at Ticklemore Cheese Company in Devon, near Totnes. It is made by hand using local milk.
- Isle of Wight Blue
- Lanark Blue – Scottish blue cheese made from pasteurised sheep's milk.
- Lymeswold was an English cheese variety that is no longer produced. The cheese was a soft, mild blue cheese with an edible white rind, much like Brie, and was inspired by French cheeses. Production ceased in 1992.
- Oxford Blue
- Renegade Monk – an English, ale-washed, soft blue cheese made by Feltham's Farm from organic cow's milk. Winner of the Best British Cheese award at the 2020 Virtual Cheese Awards
- Shropshire Blue – blue cheese made from pasteurised cows' milk that is prepared using vegetable rennet.
- Stichelton – English blue cheese similar to Blue Stilton cheese, except that it does not use pasteurised milk or factory-produced rennet.
- Stilton (Protected Designation of Origin) – English cheese, produced in two varieties: the blue variety is known for its characteristic strong smell and taste. The lesser-known white Stilton cheese is a milder, semi-soft cheese.
- Strathdon Blue
- Blue Wensleydale – crumbly, moist cheese produced in Wensleydale, North Yorkshire, England.
- Yorkshire Blue

== Hard cheeses ==
Granular cheese, or hard cheese, refers to a wide variety of cheeses produced by repeatedly stirring and draining a mixture of curd and whey. Some hard cheeses are aged for years.

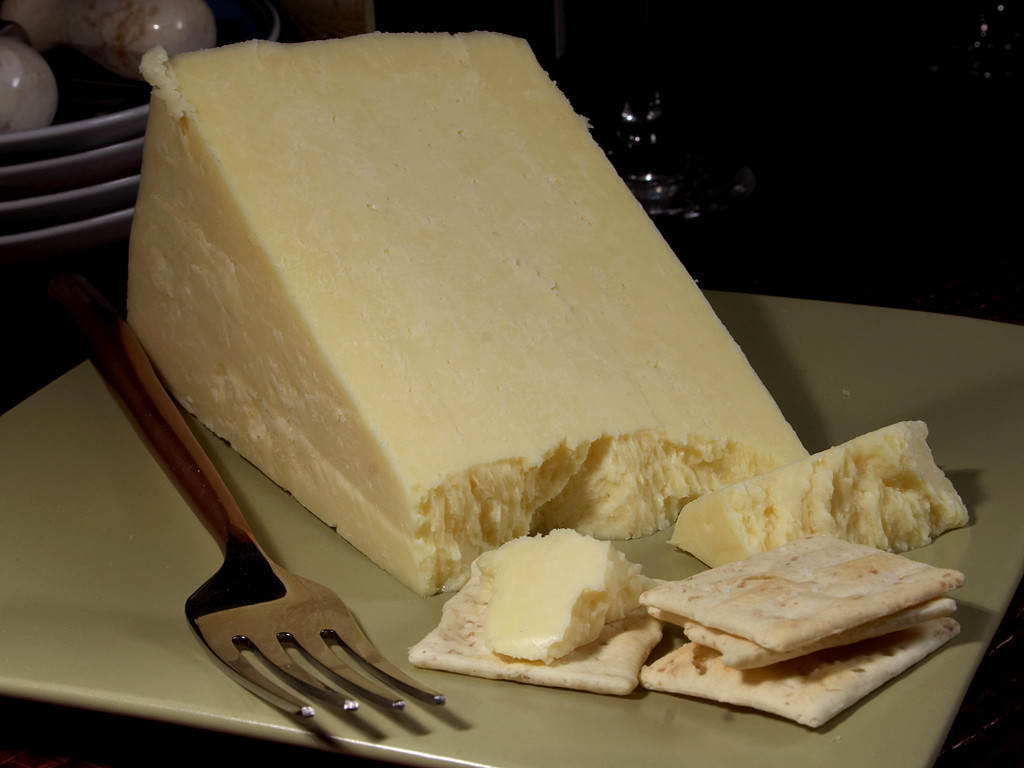
Caerphilly cheese

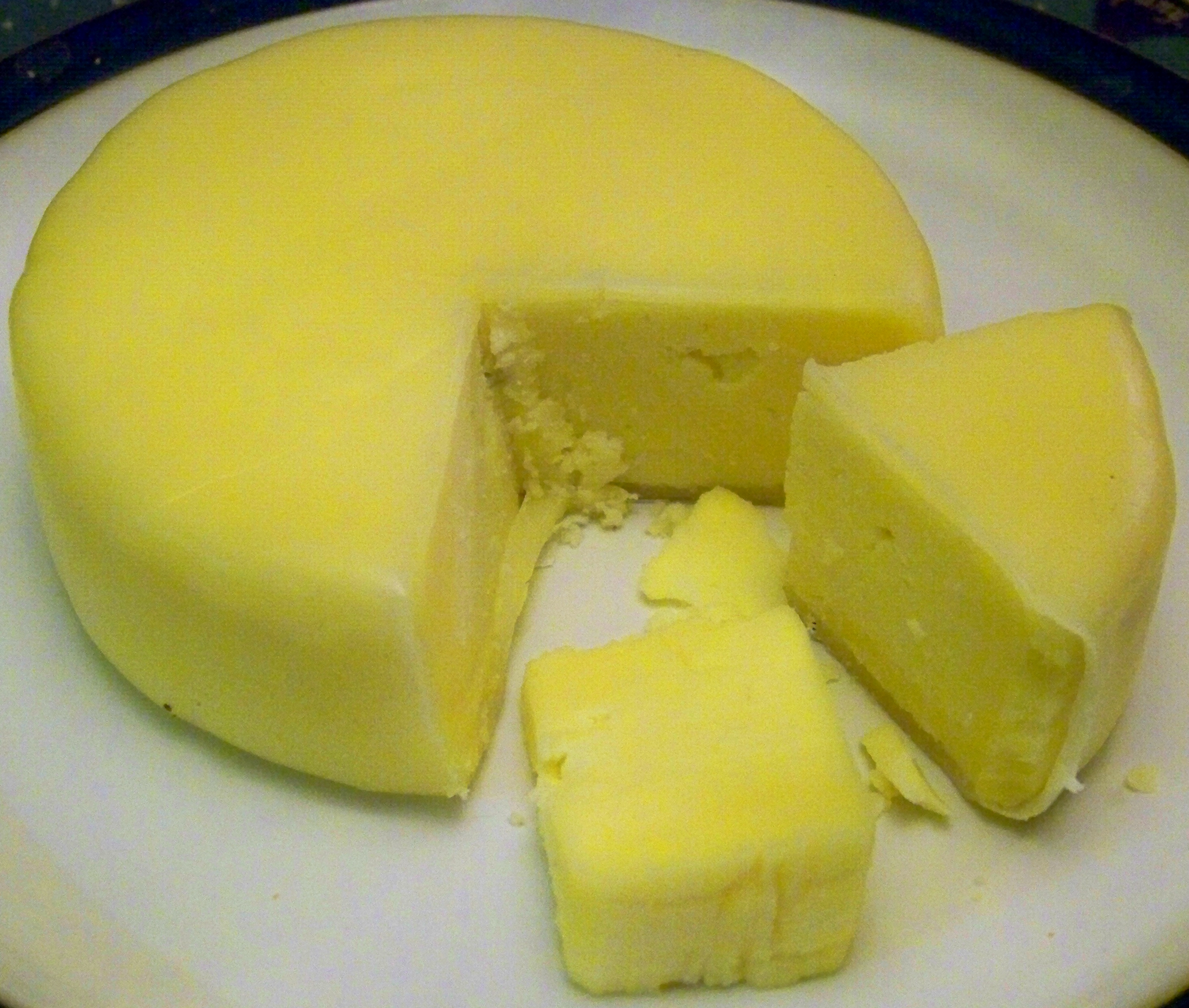
Swaledale cheese

- Ashdown Foresters – cow's milk hard cheese made in England with a sweet, nutty flavour.
- Caerphilly – light-coloured (almost white), crumbly cheese made from cow's milk, with a fat content around 48%. It has a mild taste, accented with slightly sour tang.
- Cheddar – relatively hard, pale yellow to off-white (unless coloured with additives), and sometimes sharp-tasting. Originating in the English village of Cheddar in Somerset, cheeses of this style are produced in many countries around the world.
  - Major UK Cheddar makers include:
    - Wyke Farms
    - Pilgrims Choice
    - Cathedral City Cheddar
    - Davidstow Cheddar
    - Dorset Drum
    - West Country Farmhouse Cheddar (Protected Designation of Origin)
    - Applewood
- Cheshire – dense and crumbly cheese produced in the English county of Cheshire and four neighbouring counties, two in Wales (Denbighshire and Flintshire) and two in England (Shropshire and Staffordshire).
- Duddleswell – hard creamy cheese with a nutty flavour.
- Dunlop cheese – mild 'sweet-milk cheese' from Dunlop in East Ayrshire, Scotland, resembling a soft Cheddar cheese in texture.
- Hereford Hop – firm cheese with a rind of toasted hops.
- Lancashire – cow's-milk cheese from the county of Lancashire, in three distinct varieties: young 'Creamy Lancashire' and mature 'Tasty Lancashire' are produced by a traditional method, whereas 'Crumbly Lancashire' (locally known as 'Lancashire Crumbly' ) is a more recent creation suitable for mass production.
  - Beacon Fell Traditional Lancashire Cheese (Protected Designation of Origin)
- Lincolnshire Poacher – hard unpasteurised cow's milk cheese generally made in cylinders, with a rind resembling granite.
- Red Leicester – English cheese made in a similar manner to Cheddar cheese, although it is crumblier. Since the 18th century, it has been coloured orange by adding annatto extract during manufacture.
- Staffordshire (Protected Designation of Origin) – crumbly white cheese from the county of Staffordshire.
- Swaledale (Protected Designation of Origin) – full fat hard cheese produced in the town of Richmond in Swaledale, North Yorkshire, England.
- Teviotdale (Protected Geographical Indication) – produced from the milk of Jersey cattle, although there are no known current producers of this cheese. It is a full fat, hard cheese produced in the area of Teviotdale on the border lands between Scotland and England, within 90 km from the summit of Peel Fell in the Cheviot Hills.
- Y Fenni – variety of Welsh cheese, consisting of Cheddar cheese blended with mustard seed and ale. It has a firm texture.
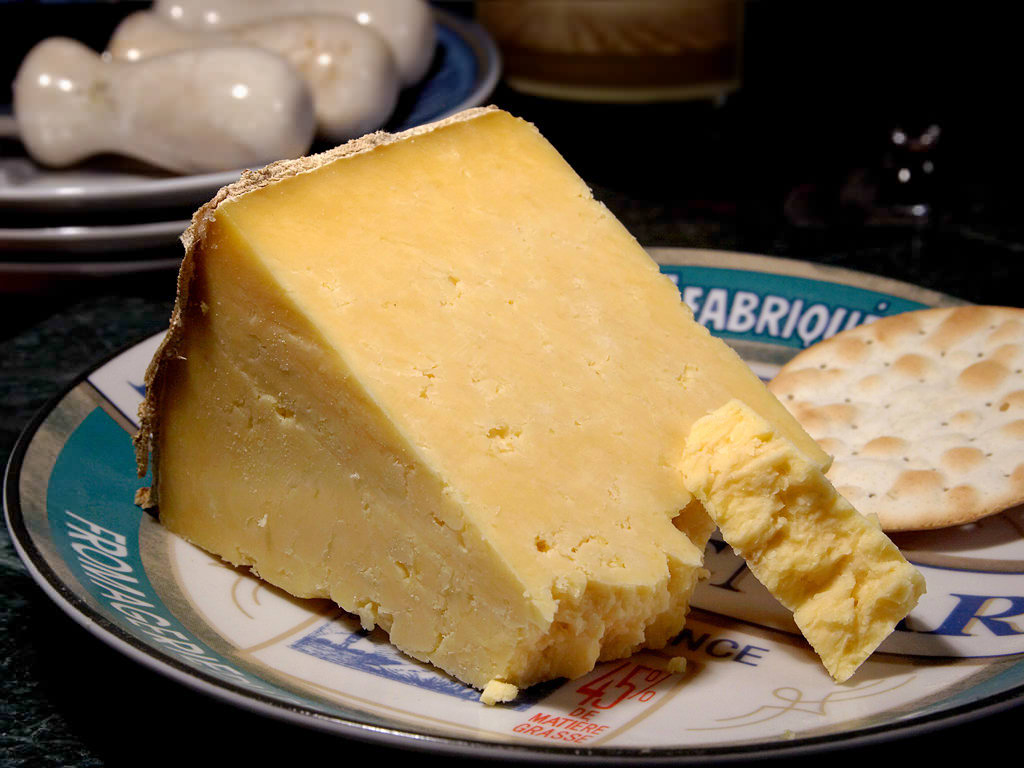
Cheshire cheese

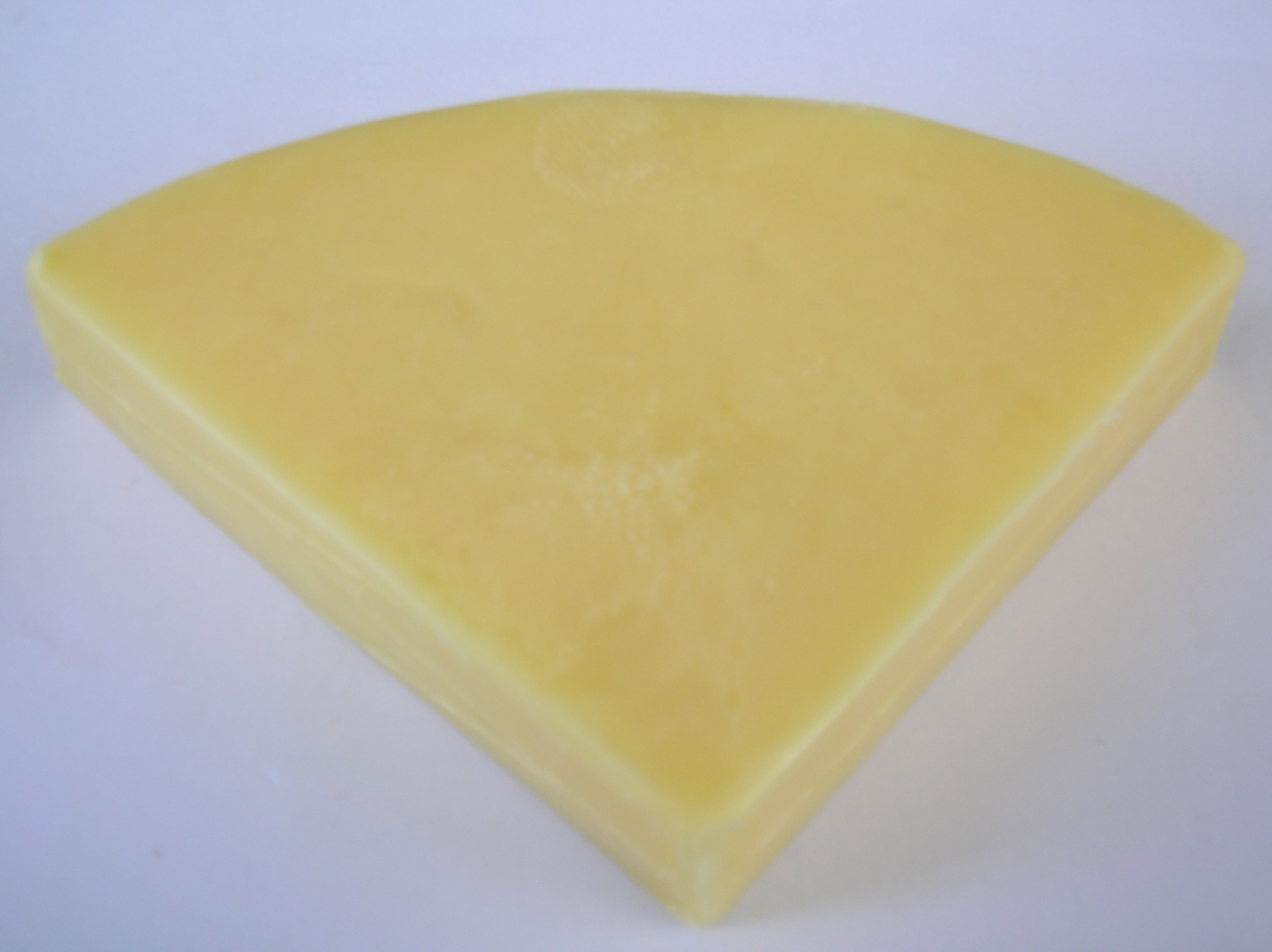
Dunlop cheese

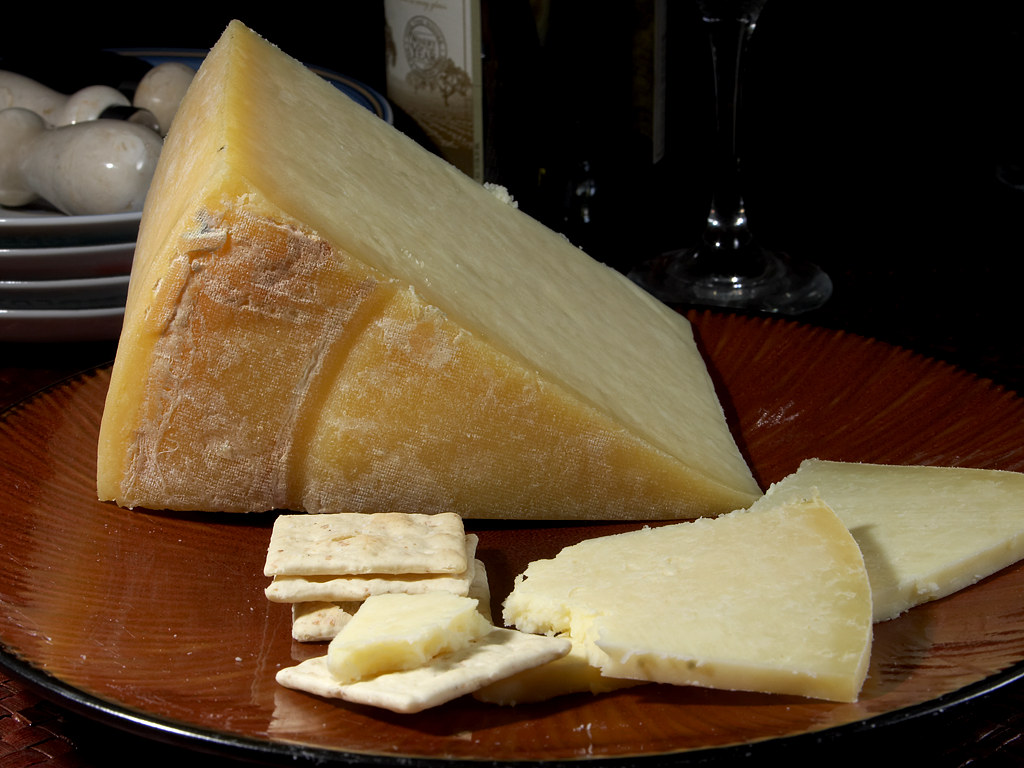
Lancashire cheese

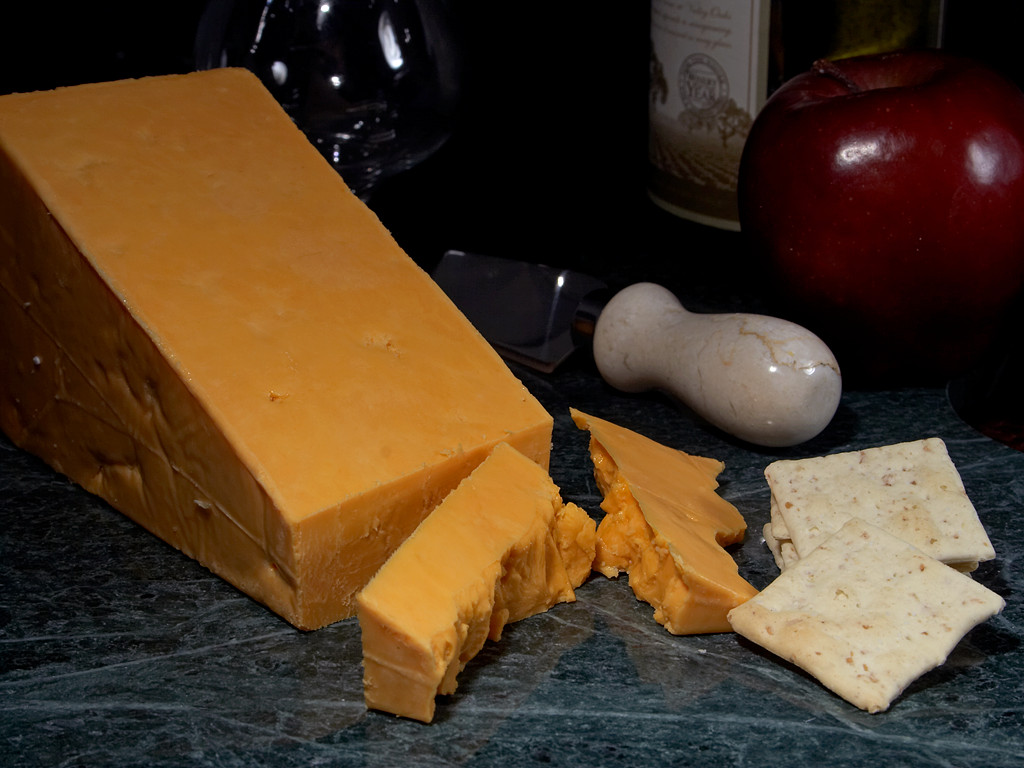
Red Leicester

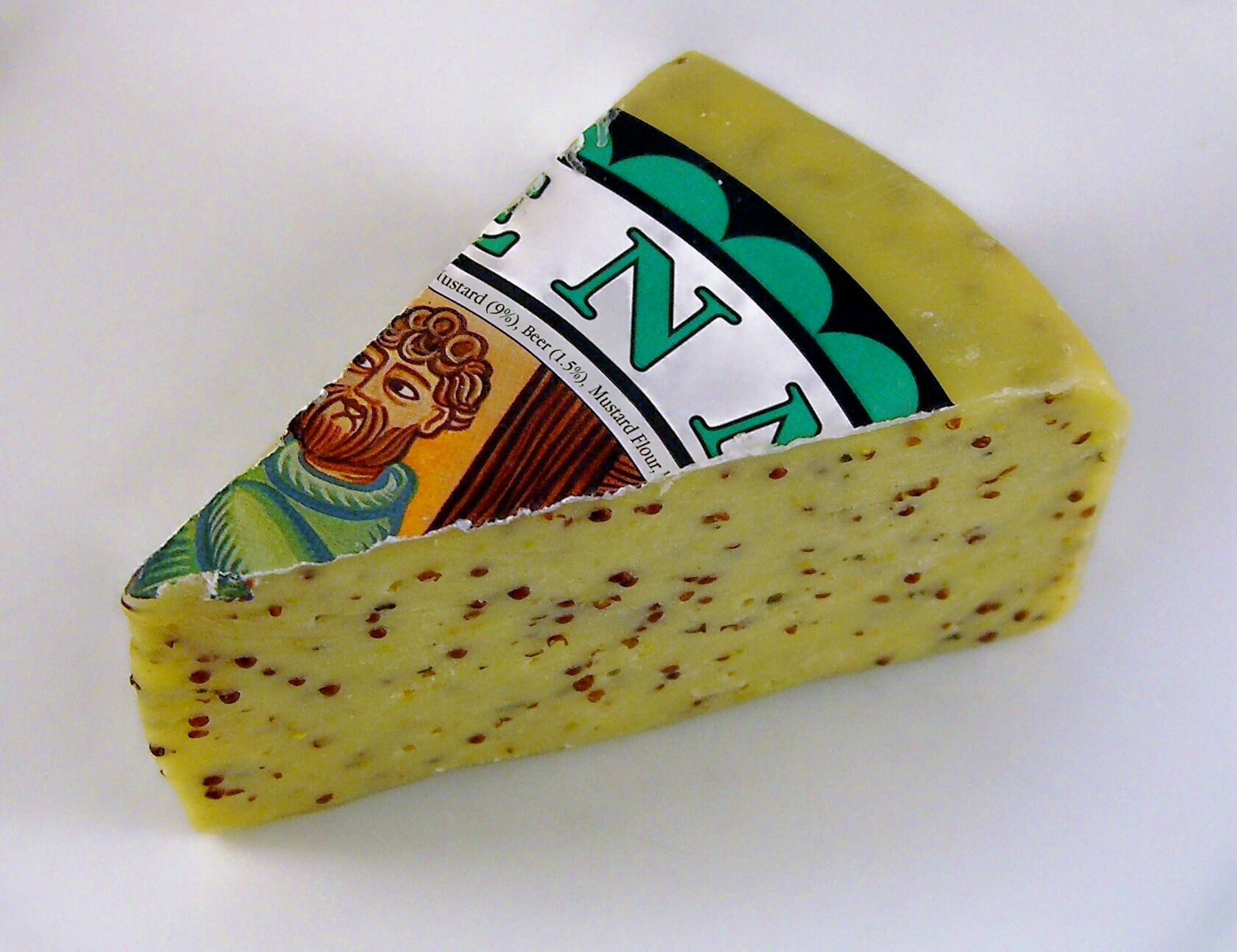
Y Fenni cheese

== Semi-hard cheeses ==
Cheeses that are classified as semi-hard to hard include Cheddar. Cheddar is one of a family of semi-hard or hard cheeses (including Cheshire and Gloucester), whose curd is cut, gently heated, piled, and stirred before being pressed into forms.

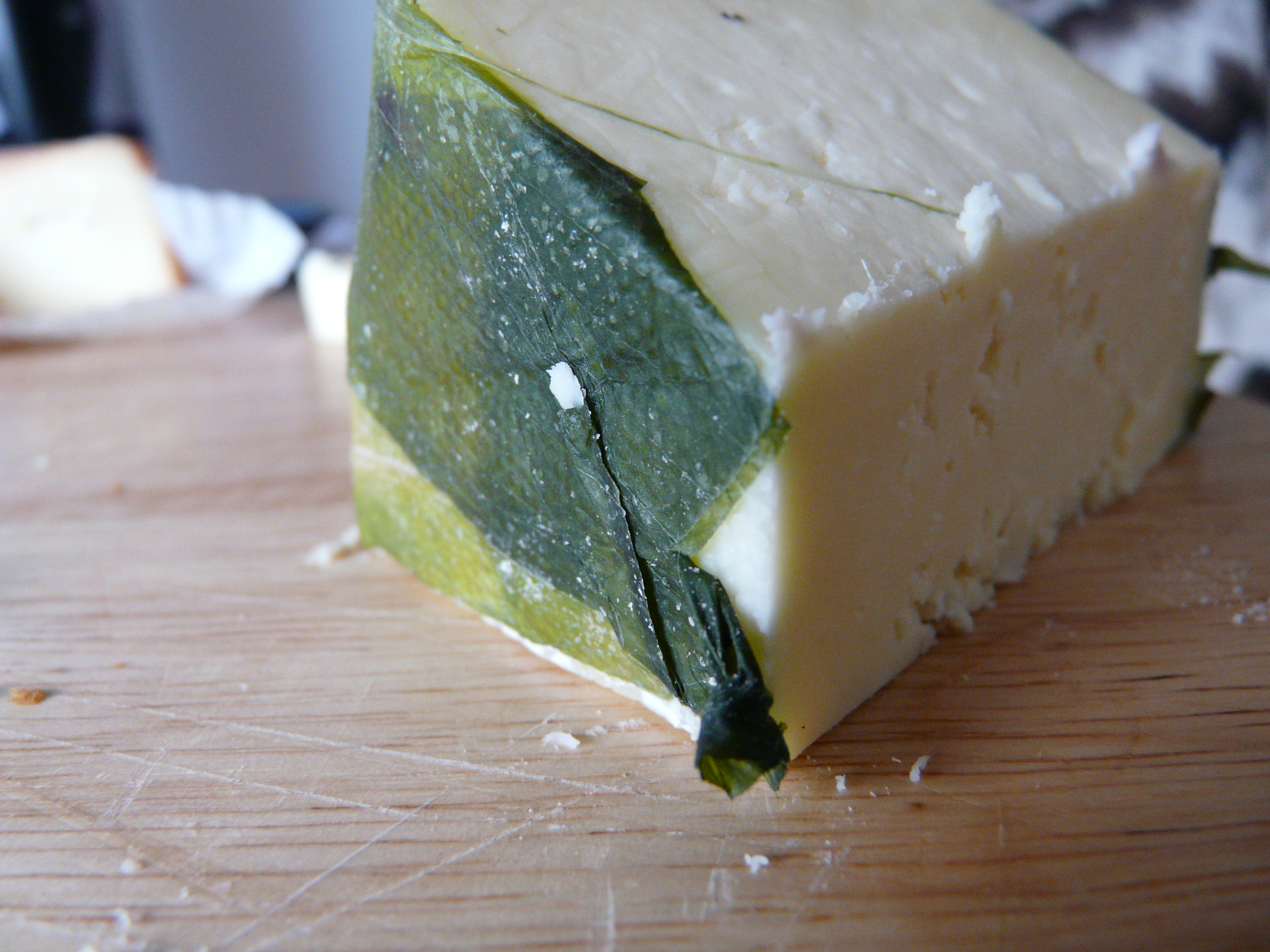
Cornish Yarg prepared with wild garlic

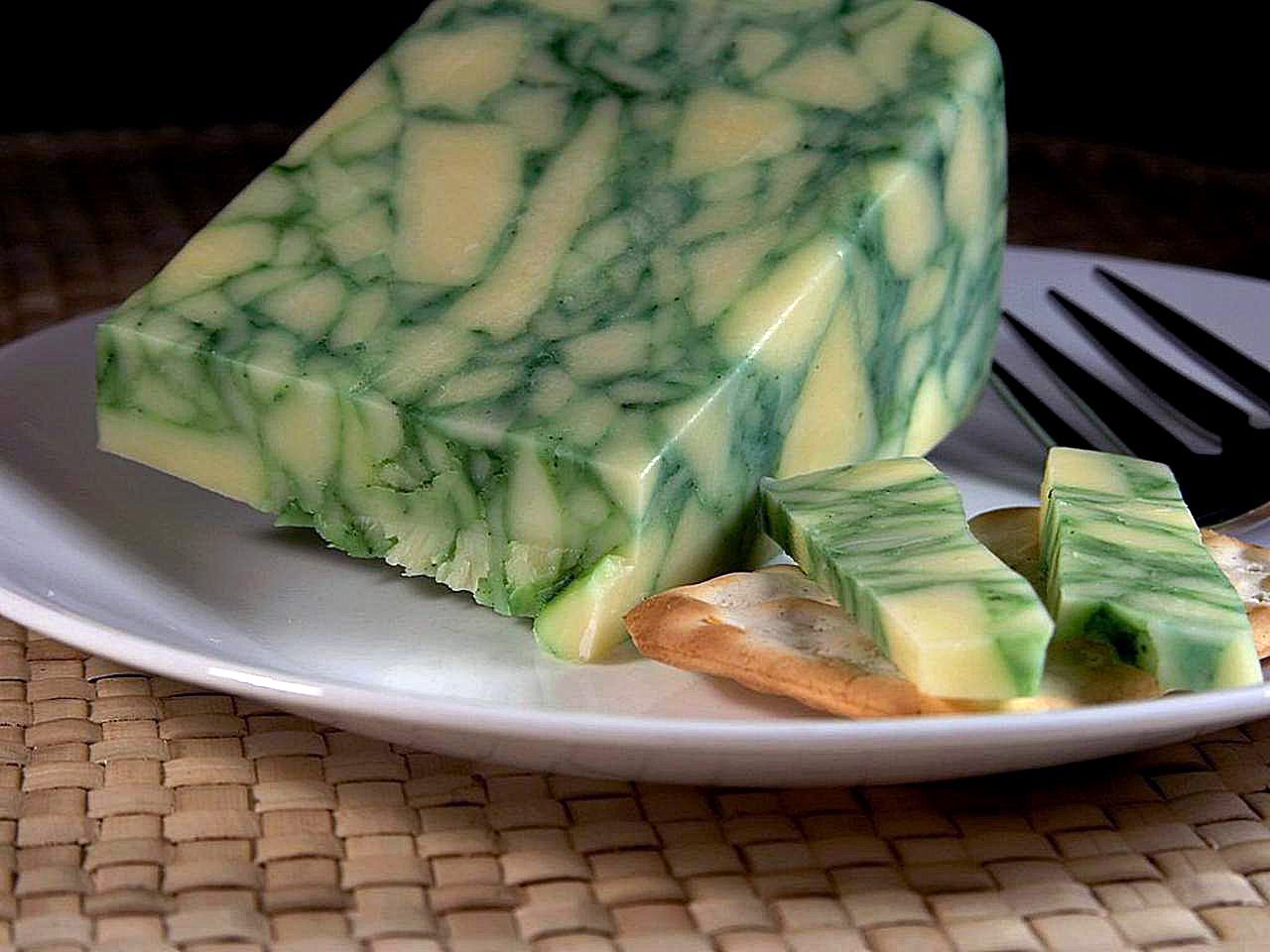
Sage Derby

- Coquetdale – full-fat semi-hard cheese, made from pasteurised cow's milk and vegetarian rennet.
- Cornish Yarg – semi-hard cow's milk cheese made in Cornwall from the milk of Friesian cows. Before being left to mature, this cheese is wrapped in nettle leaves to form an edible, though mouldy, rind.
  - Wild Garlic Yarg
- Cotswold – made by blending chives and spring onions into Double Gloucester. The orange cheese is coloured similarly to Cotswold stone.
- Derby – mild, semi-firm British cow's milk cheese made in Derbyshire with a smooth, mellow texture and a buttery flavour.
  - Little Derby – Derby-style cheese made outside Derbyshire, similar in flavour and texture to Cheddar, but without the annatto colouring used in Derby cheese.
  - Sage Derby – variety of Derby cheese that is mild, mottled green and semi-hard, and has a sage flavour. The colour is from sage and sometimes other colouring added to the curds, producing a marbling effect and a subtle herb flavour.
- Gloucester cheese – traditional unpasteurised, semi-hard cheese which has been made in Gloucestershire, England, since the 16th century, at one time made only with the milk of the once nearly extinct Gloucester cattle. There are two types of Gloucester cheese: Single and Double; both are traditionally made from milk from Gloucestershire breed cows farmed within the English county of Gloucestershire.
  - Single Gloucester (Protected Designation of Origin)
  - Double Gloucester
  - Goosnargh Gold – rich Double Gloucester cheese with buttery flavour.
- Keltic Gold – Cornish semi-hard cheese dipped in cider. The milk comes from Trewithen Dairy and the cider from Cornish Orchards.
- Red Windsor – pale cream English cheddar cheese, made using pasteurised cow's milk marbled with a wine, often a Bordeaux wine or a blend of port wine and brandy.
- Wensleydale – also produced as a blue cheese, and with many variants that include additions such as cranberries or ginger.
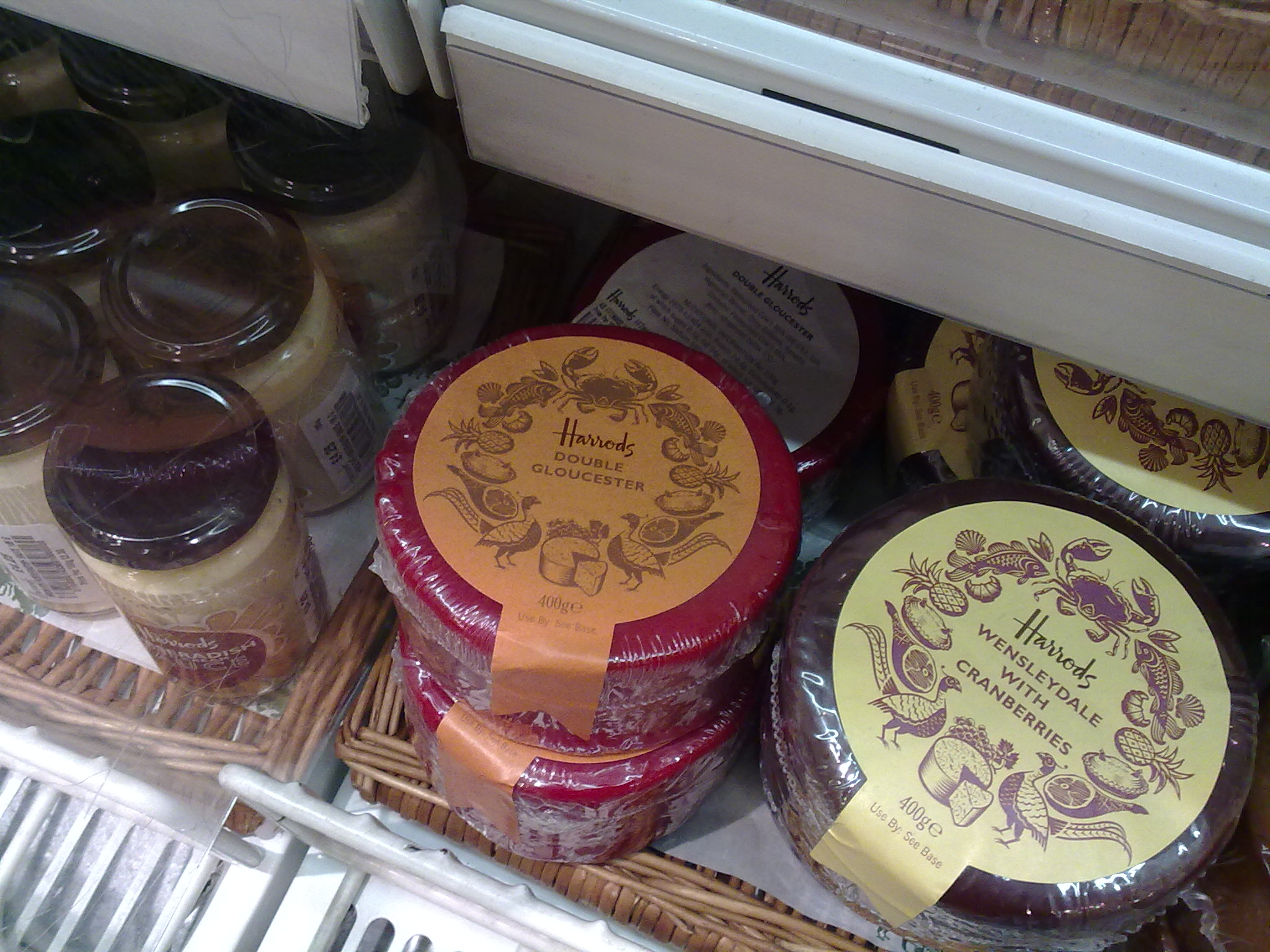
Double Gloucester cheese (centre)

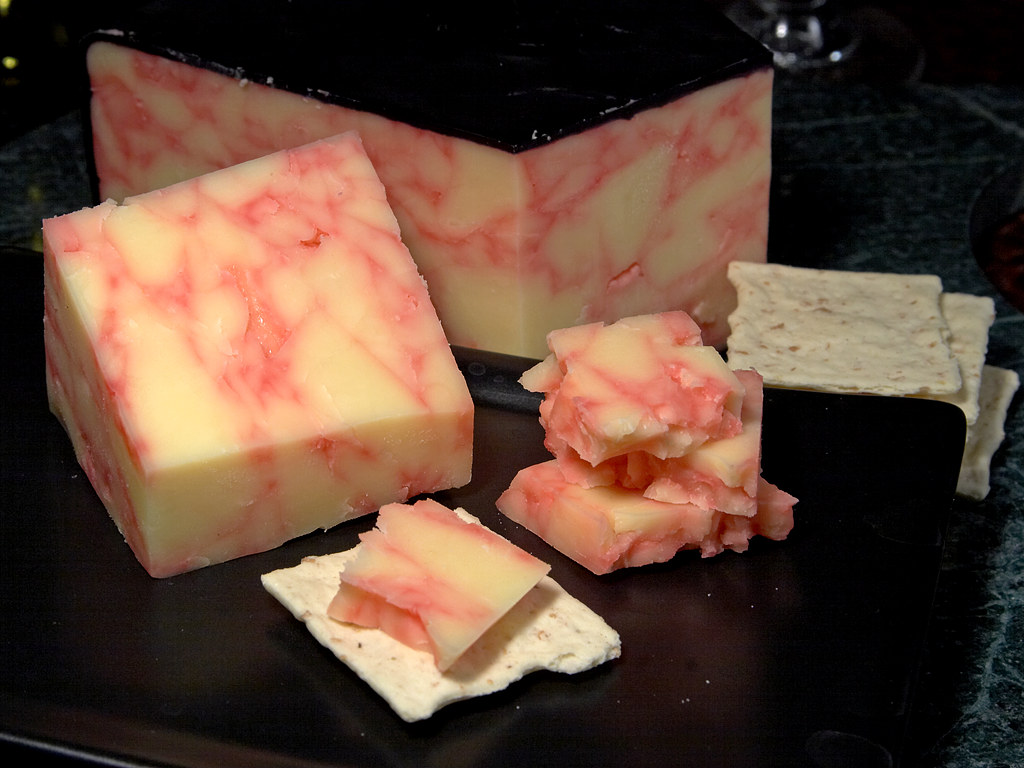
Red Windsor

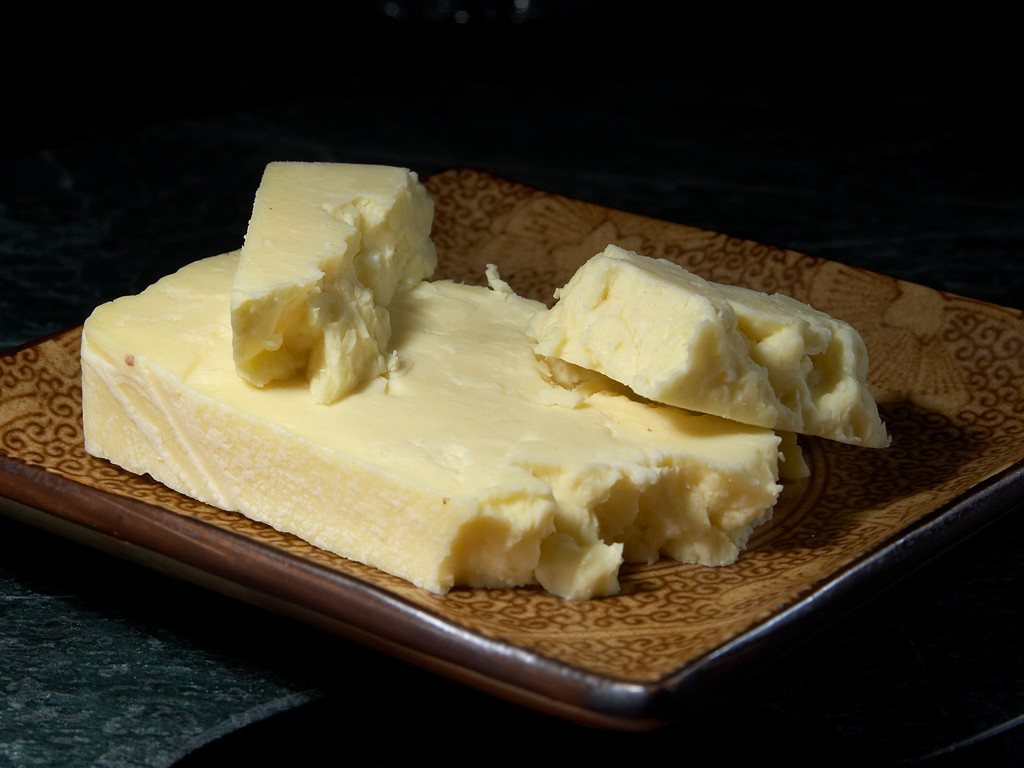
Wensleydale cheese

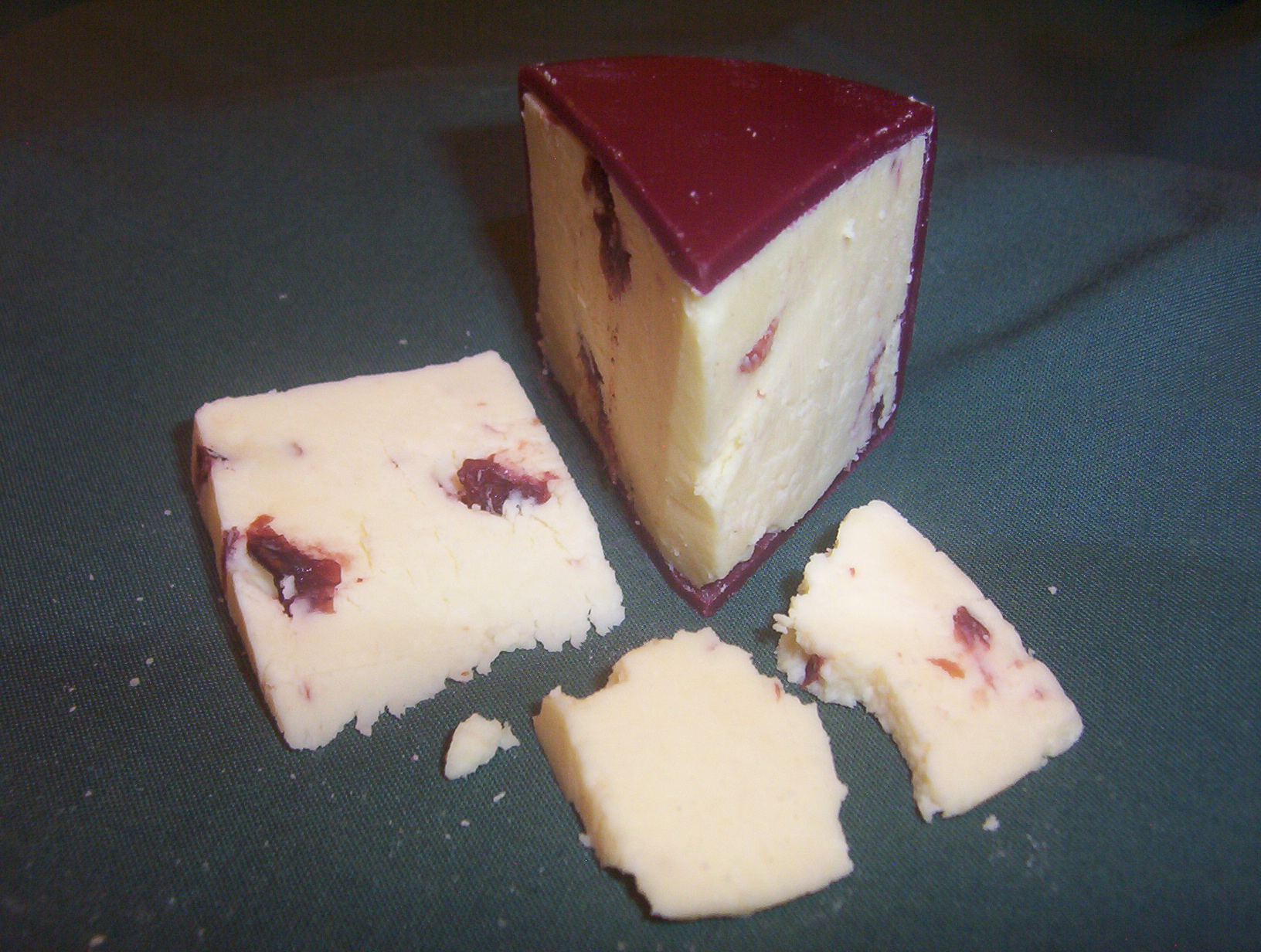
Wensleydale with cranberries

== Soft and semi-soft cheeses ==
Semi-soft cheeses have a high moisture content and tend to be blander in flavour compared to harder cheeses.

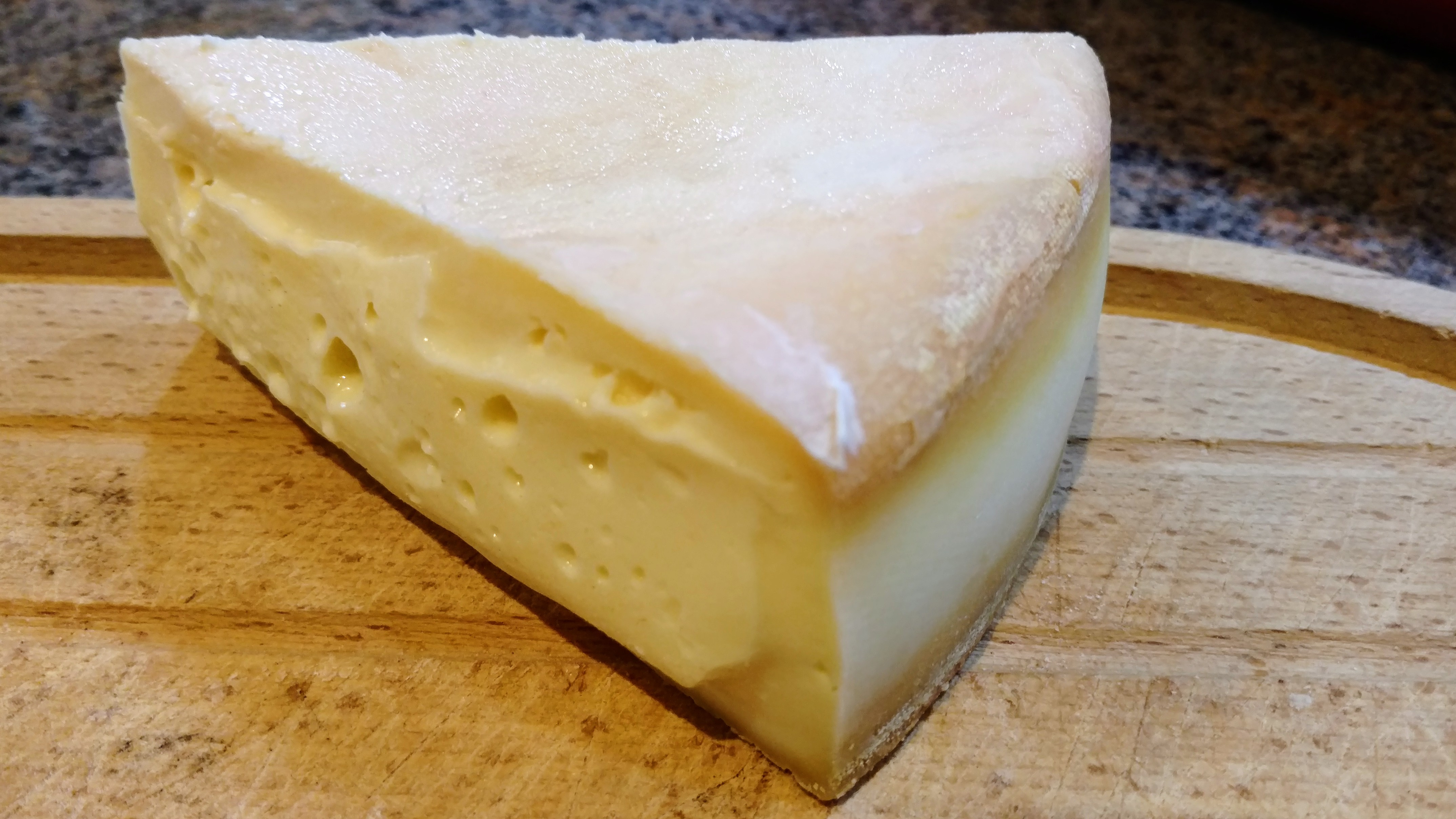
Stinking Bishop

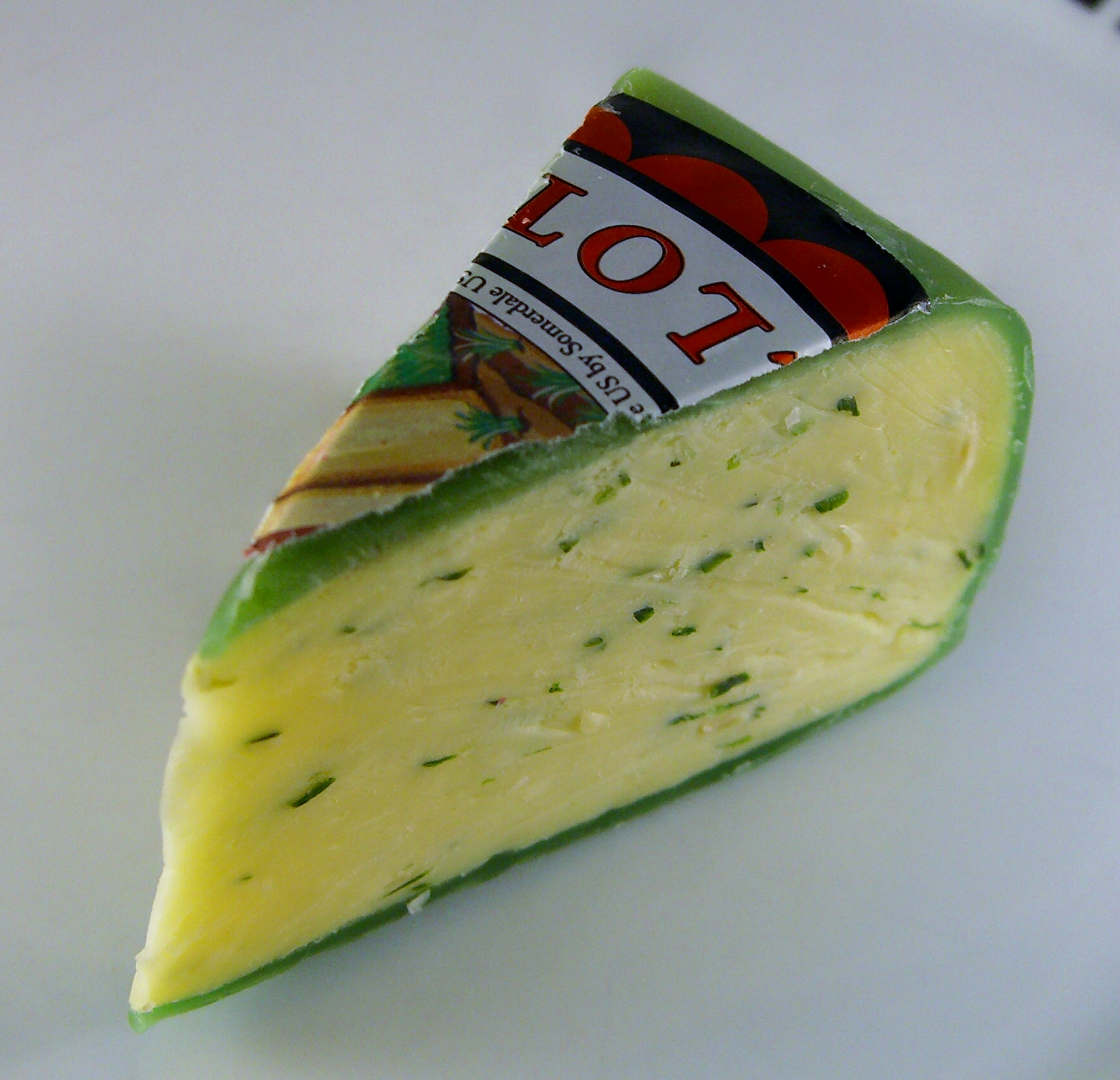
Tintern cheese

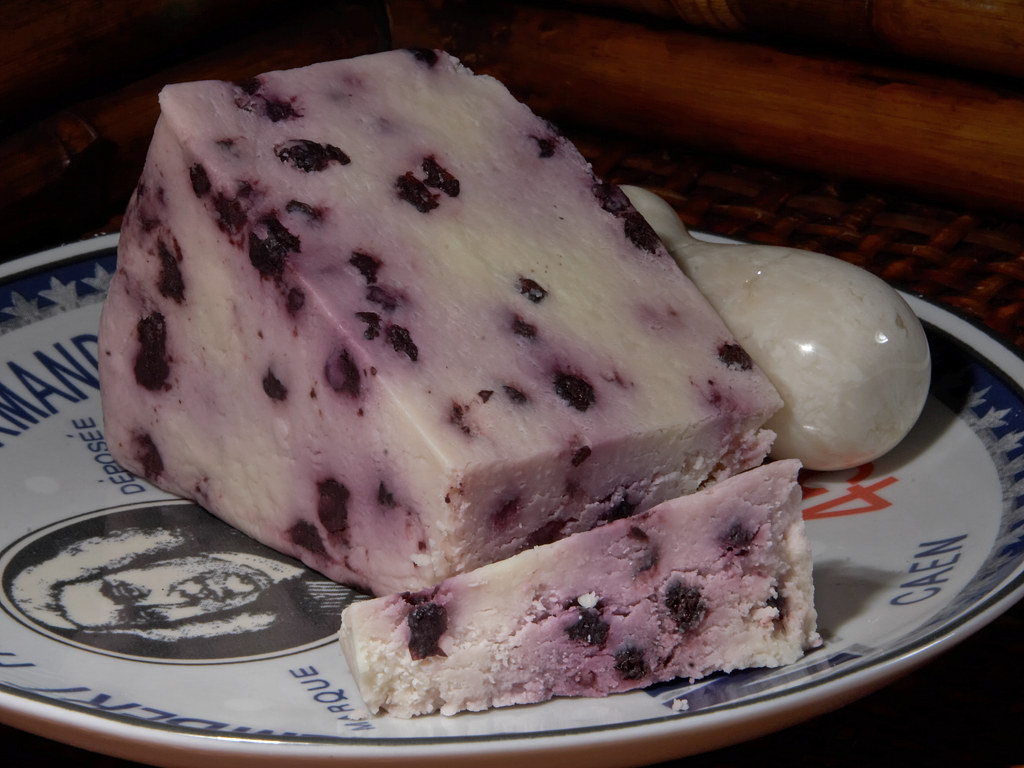
White Stilton cheese, prepared with blueberries

- Bath Soft Cheese
- Baron Bigod - a Brie-de-meaux style cheese, produced by Fen Farm Dairy
- Beacon Fell traditional Lancashire (Protected Designation of Origin) – semi-soft cheese prepared with cow's milk that is produced in the region of Lancashire.
- Bonchester (Protected Designation of Origin) – Scottish soft cheese made from cow's milk, produced at Bonchester Bridge, Roxburghshire.
- Brie – soft cow's milk cheese named after Brie, the French region from which it originated.
  - Cornish Brie – type of brie-style, soft, white rinded cheese from Cornwall in the United Kingdom.
- Caboc – Scottish cream cheese, made with double cream or cream-enriched milk. This rennet-free cheese is formed into a log shape and rolled in toasted pinhead oatmeal, to be served with oatcakes or dry toast.
- Chevington – cow's milk cheese, made in Northumberland, England, by the Northumberland Cheese Company. It is semi-soft and mould-ripened.
- Crowdie – low-fat Scottish cream cheese. The cheese is often eaten with oatcakes, and recommended before a ceilidh as it is said to alleviate the effects of whisky-drinking. The texture is soft and crumbly, the taste slightly sour.
- Fine Fettle Yorkshire – formerly named Yorkshire Feta; a sheep's milk cheese.
- Oxford Isis – full fat soft cheese with honey-mead washed rind.
- Parlick Fell – white cheese made from ewe's milk with a semi-soft, crumbly texture and a tangy, nutty flavour.
- Renegade Monk – an English, ale-washed, soft blue cheese made by Feltham's Farm from organic cow's milk. Winner of the Best British Cheese award at the 2020 Virtual Cheese Awards
- Stinking Bishop – award-winning, washed-rind cheese produced since 1994 by Charles Martell and Son at Hunts Court Farm, Dymock, Gloucestershire, in the south west of England.
- Sussex Slipcote – fresh cheese made from ewe's milk by the High Weald Dairy in West Sussex, England.
- Tesyn – soft Cornish goat's milk cheese.
- Tintern – soft, blended mature creamy Cheddar cheese flavoured with fresh chives and shallots.
- Tunworth – soft, nutty cheese.
- Waterloo – semi-soft, off-white British cheese originating from the Duke of Wellington's estate; made from full-fat, unpasteurised Guernsey milk.
- White Stilton – semi-soft cheese. Some varieties are produced with additions such as blueberries.
- Whitehaven – white mould-ripened cheese made from pasteurised local goat's milk in Cheshire.
- Winslade – mild soft cheese from Hampshire similar in style to a Vicherin.

== Other ==
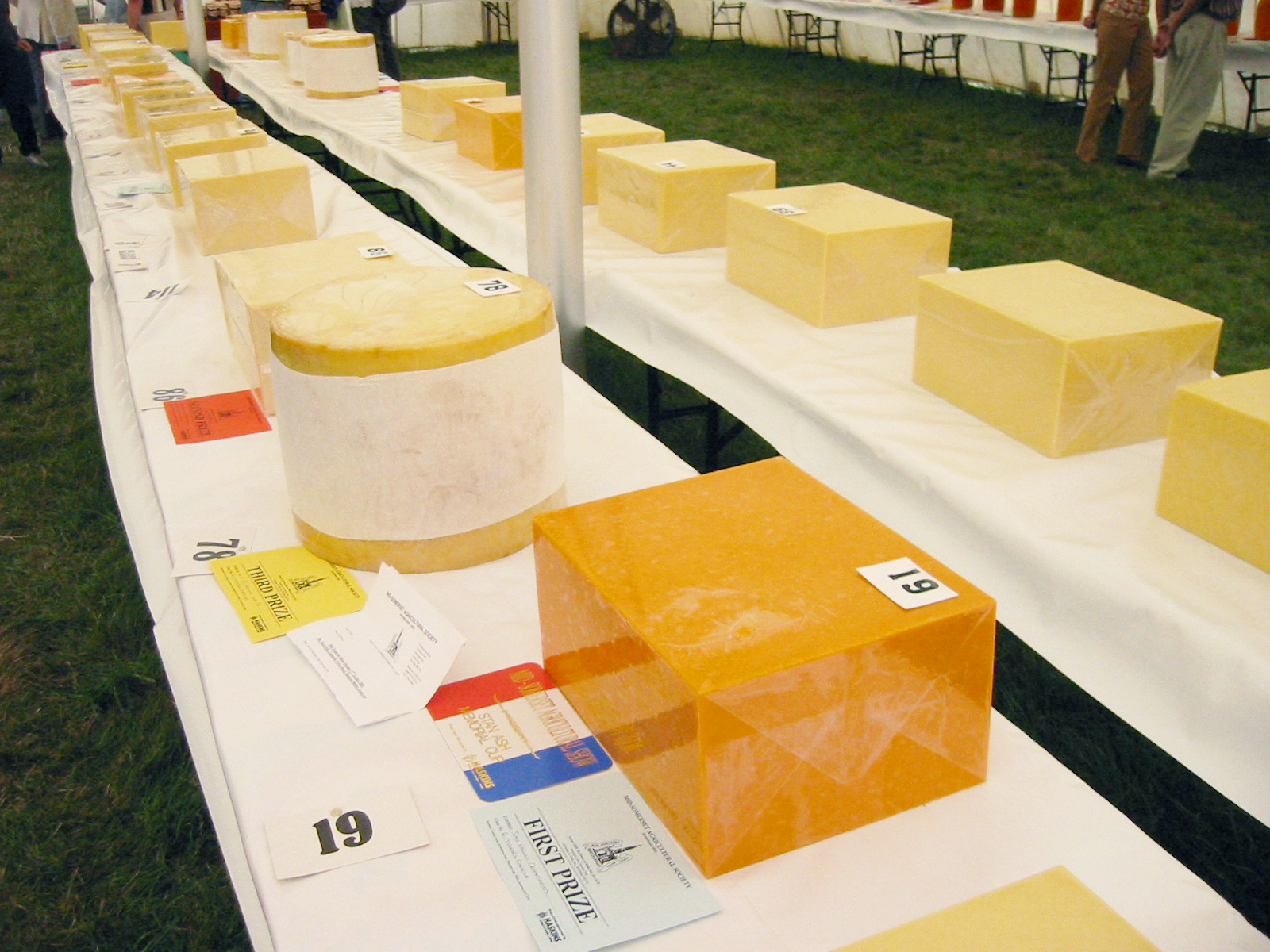
A selection of local cheeses on display at the 2003 Mid-Somerset Show, an agricultural show held annually in Shepton Mallet, Somerset, England

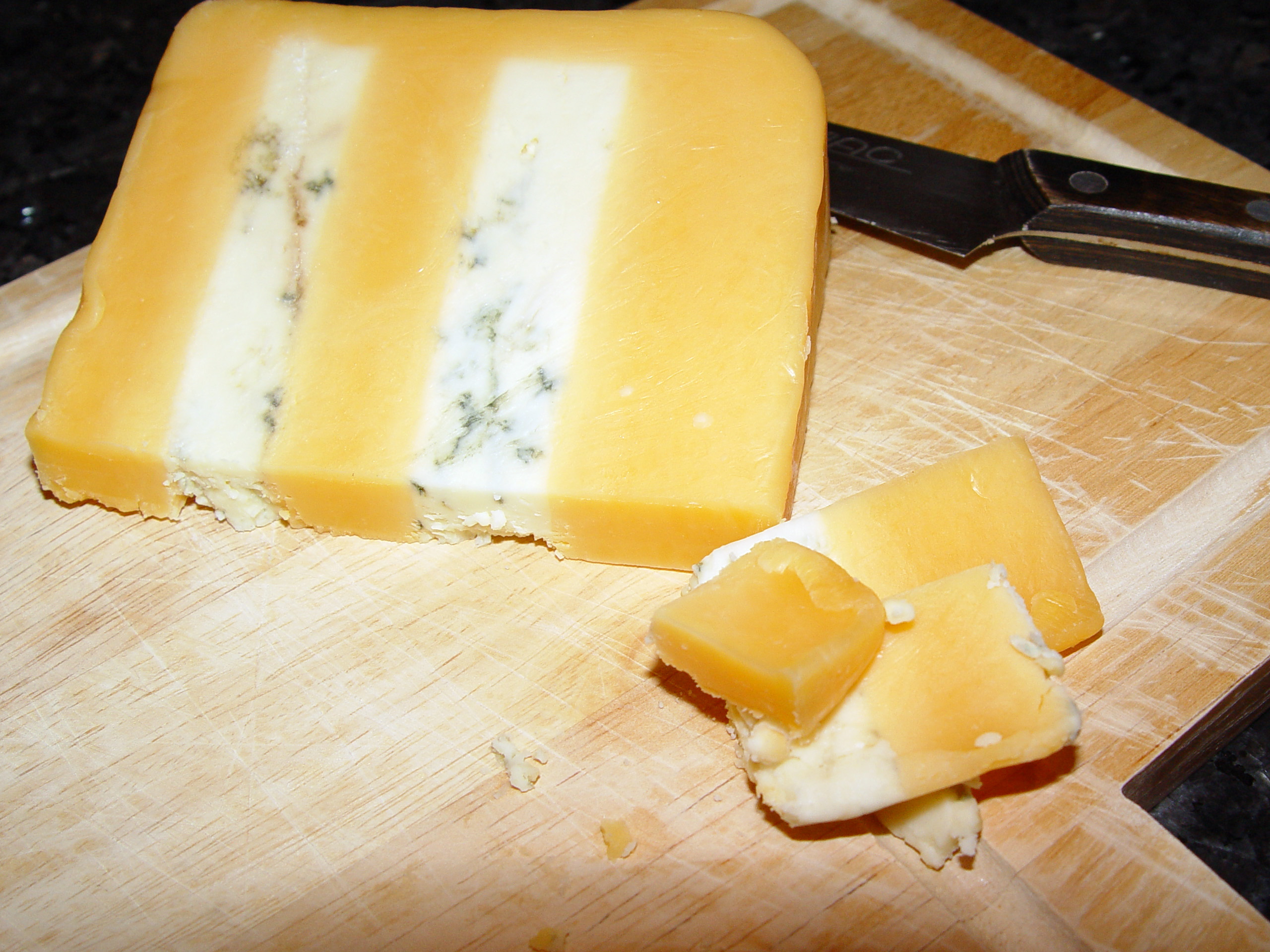
Huntsman cheese

- Allerdale – moist, sweet cheese.
- Berkswell
- Brinkburn
- Caithness
- Cotherstone
- Coverdale
- Croglin
- Dorstone
- Farleigh Wallop was created by Alex James and Juliet Harbutt. It is prepared by Peter Humphries in Somerset at White Lake Cheeses.
- Goldilocks – mould-ripened soft cheese made from organic Jersey cattle cow's milk.
  - Black Eyed Susan
- Golden Cross – soft white goat's milk cheese made from the milk of hay-fed goats, it receives a light dusting of charcoal.
- Grimbister – crumbly, white, cows' milk cheese, similar to Wensleydale, made on Orkney.
- Gruth Dhu – soft Scottish cheese
- Harlech
- Huntsman – combination of Double Gloucester and Stilton.
- Isle of Mull – Scottish Cheddar cheese made from raw cow milk, produced on the Isle of Mull.
- Little Wallop
- Pantysgawn – Welsh goat's milk cheese with a high moisture content and limited shelf life.
- Suffolk Gold
- Wiltshire Loaf
- Wyfe of Bath
- Village Green Goat

== See also ==
- List of English cheeses
- List of Irish cheeses
- List of cheeses
- List of cheesemakers
- List of dairy products
- Cheese Shop sketch

== Bibliography ==
- Harbutt, Juliet (2009). World Cheese Book. London: DK Publishing. ISBN 978-1405336819.
- Ridgway, Judy (2002). The Cheese Companion: The Connoisseur's Guide. Pennsylvania: Running Press. ISBN 978-0762405008.
- Caldwell, Gianaclis (19 September 2012). Mastering Artisan Cheesemaking: The Ultimate Guide for Home-Scale and Market Producers. Vermont: Chelsea Green Publishing. ISBN 978-1603583329.
- Jenkins, Steven W. (1996). Cheese Primer. New York: Workman Publishing Company. ISBN 978-0894807626.
- Linford, Jenny (2008). Great British Cheeses: Choose and Enjoy Over 300 Classic and Regional Cheese. London: DK Publishing. ISBN 978-1405334365.
- Southall, Helen (1990). Good Housekeeping: The New Cookery Encyclopedia. Ebury Press.
- Beeton, Isabella (2011). Mrs Beeton How to Cook: 220 Classic Recipes Updated for the Modern Cook. Paris: Hachette UK. ISBN 978-0297865971.
- MacIntosh, John (1894). Ayrshire Nights Entertainments: A Descriptive Guide to the History, Traditions, Antiquities, etc. of the County of Ayr. Kilmarnock. ISBN 978-1348065241.
- Wilson, Sean (2012). The Great Northern Cookbook. Paris: Hachette UK. ISBN 978-1444761139.
- Barham, Elizabeth; Sylvander, Bertil (2011). Labels of Origin for Food: Local Development, Global Recognition. Wallingford: CABI. ISBN 978-1845933524.
- Musschoot, Dirk (2006). Mijn Reisgids Noord-engeland. Tielt: Lannoo Uitgeverij. ISBN 978-9020963977. (in Dutch)
- Agricultural Surveys: Caithness (1812). Great Britain: Board of Agriculture. 1812.
- Fox, Patrick F.; McSweeney, Paul L. H.; Cogan, Timothy M.; Guinee, Timothy P. (2004). Cheese: Chemistry, Physics and Microbiology, Volume 1: General Aspects. Massachusetts: Academic Press. ISBN 978-0122636523.
- Rose, Lesley Anne (2008). The Lake District. Bath: Crimson Publishing, Limited. ISBN 978-1854584250.
- Ultimate Food Journeys: The World's Best Dishes and Where to Eat Them. London: DK Eyewitness. 2011. ISBN 978-1405358668.
- Waitrose Food Illustrated. John Brown Contract Publishing. 2004.
- Miller, Laurel; Skinner, Thalassa (2012). Cheese for Dummies. Culture Magazine. ISBN 978-1118099391.
- England:-County of Norfolk, by R. Henry Rew. C.-7915.-Selected districts in the counties of Oxford, Gloucester, Wilts, and Berks, and on the neighbourhood of Taunton, Somerset, by Aubrey J. Spencer. Frome district of Somerset and the Stratford-on-Avon district of Warwickshire, by Jabez Turner. C.-7372.-County of Suffolk, by Arthur Wilson Fox. C.-7755.-Poultry rearing and fattening industry of the Heathfield district of Sussex, by R. Henry Rew. C.-7623.-Salisbury Plain district of Wiltshire, by R. Henry Rew. C.-7624. Scotland:-Counties of Ayr, Wigtown, Kirkcudbright, and Dumfries, by John Speir. C.-7625.-Counties of Perth, Fife, Forfar, and Aberdeen, by James. Great Britain: Royal Commission on Agriculture, H.M. Stationery Office. 1895.
