= Chevington =

Chevington may refer to:

- Chevington, Suffolk, a village in England
- Chevington cheese, a cow's milk cheese
- East Chevington, a parish in Northumberland, England
- West Chevington, a location in Northumberland, England
  - Chevington railway station, a former station serving West Chevington

== See also ==
- Shevington, a village and civil parish within the Metropolitan Borough of Wigan, England
