= Pantysgawn =

Brand of Welsh goat cheese

- Other names: Pant-Ysgawn
- Country of origin: United Kingdom
- Region: Wales
- Town: Blaenavon
- Source of milk: Goats
- Pasteurised: Yes
- Texture: Soft

Pantysgawn, also known as Pant-Ysgawn, is a brand of goat cheese produced in Blaenavon, Wales. It was the first cheese produced by Pam and Tony Craske at Pant-Ys-Gawn Farm in Wales, and its success resulted in the couple founding the Abergavenny Fine Foods Company. It is now produced in Blaenavon by the Craske family from locally produced goat's curd from Soil Association certified farms.

Pantysgawn has been served at NATO receptions, at St. David's Day celebrations at 10 Downing Street and to Queen Elizabeth on her visit to Cardiff in 2015.

== History ==
Pantysgawn is named due to the origins of the cheese at Pant-Ys-Gawn Farm. After Pam and Tony Craske moved there in 1981, they decided that arable and livestock farming was unsuitable. This coupled with the remote nature of the farm, meant they wished to become reliant on their own produce. With this in mind, Tony went to a nearby market with the intention of buying a cow for milk production. He returned to Pant-Ys-Gawn with six goats.

Having more milk than they could use themselves, the couple sought information on cheese making from the local library. Pam began to sell the cheese at the Abergavenny Women's Institute market, which was successful, and over the following years the business developed into Abergavenny Fine Foods Ltd. in 1987. The cheese continues to be made by the Craske family, now in Blaenavon from locally produced goat milk curd. All of the curds come from Soil Association certified farms. No rennet is used in the production of Pantysgawn. Outside of Wales, it is on sale within the United Kingdom in the supermarket Waitrose.

It has subsequently been highlighted as an example of a quality Welsh product, such as being included in the selection of Welsh food served to NATO delegates at the UK reception in Brussels, Belgium, on 8 July 2014. It featured as a pantysgawn and beetroot salad starter at British Prime Minister David Cameron's St. David's Day reception at 10 Downing Street in 2015. Later that year it was served as part of the lunch served to Queen Elizabeth II when she visited Cardiff on 11 June 2015, as a timbale of red pepper and pantysgawn which was served as the vegetarian starter.

== Description ==
The production of Pantysgawn uses only pasteurised goat's milk. It is ripened for an average of three weeks, and is produced in small rounds as well as larger 2-pound (0.91 kg) logs. Andrew McMeel, in his book 1001 Foods To Die For, described the taste as "creamy and gentle, delicately salty with a faint lemon tang."

== Reception ==
In 2015, Pantysgawn was one of several British cheeses discussed by writer Julie Bindel for The Guardian. In the article she suggested that more home-grown cheese, including Pantysgawn, should be eaten by British consumers. McMeel described Welsh goat cheese as having a "unrivaled reputation". He added that in moving the production of Pantysgawn from a single small farm to a larger operation resulted in no loss of care in the production. It received a mention in the 2011 Lonely Planet Wales guidebook by David Atkinson and Peter Dragicevich, who recommended Pantysgawn for "cheese freaks" under "Staples and specialities" of Welsh food and drink.

== See also ==
- Goat cheese
- List of British cheeses
- List of goat milk cheeses
