= Suffolk Gold cheese =

Semi-soft cheese

Suffolk Gold
- Country of origin: England
- Region: Suffolk
- Town: Creeting St Mary
- Source of milk: Cow's milk of Guernsey cattle
- Pasteurised: Yes
- Texture: Semi-hard
- Weight: 3 kilograms (6.5 pounds)
- Aging time: 8-10 weeks

Suffolk Gold cheese is a semi-soft cheese prepared from the pasteurised cow's milk of Guernsey cattle. Suffolk Farmhouse Cheeses, a family-operated company located in Creeting St Mary, Suffolk, England, produces the cheese. The dairy was established in 2004.

== Properties ==
The cheese is aged for ten to twelve weeks, and has a buttery flavour and creamy texture. Suffolk Gold is produced in rounds that weigh 3 kilograms (6.5 pounds).

== As an ingredient ==
Suffolk Gold cheese is used as an ingredient in Fairfields Farm Crisps, a potato crisp product produced in Colchester, Essex, England.

== Awards ==
Suffolk Farmhouse Cheeses received the BALE agricultural award from the Suffolk Agricultural Association in 2013.

== See also ==
- List of British cheeses
- List of cheeses
