= Suffolk Bang =

Type of cheese produced in Suffolk, England

Suffolk Bang was a type of cheese produced in Suffolk from skimmed milk. The resulting cheese was extremely hard and was regarded as being of poor quality. It was also heavily salted in an attempt to make it last longer.

Reports of low quality hard Suffolk cheese appear as far back as the 16th century by which time it was being exported to London. The trade with London was carried out by sea and continued into the 18th century with 985 tons being sold to London in 1740. High grain prices at the start of the 19th century resulted in Suffolk farmers moving away from dairy production and as a result Suffolk Bang largely stopped being made.

The main consumers of Suffolk Bang were servants and labourers who could not afford anything better. The cheese was also used for supplying the military who valued its long shelf life. The Royal Navy purchased around 1000 tons of the cheese a year up until 1758 at which point it stopped purchasing the cheese due to its crews finding it inedible. The cheese was also made on smaller scale for unmarried farm workers. One suggested method for eating the cheese was to melt it before spreading on bread along with salted pork.
