= Coquetdale cheese =

English type of cheese

Coquetdale cheese is a full-fat semi-hard cheese, made from pasteurised cow's milk and vegetarian rennet. The cheese, which takes its name from Coquetdale, Northumberland, is produced by the Northumberland Cheese Company.

Coquetdale cheese is ripened in a mould for ten weeks, during which time it develops a yellowish-grey natural rind.

The producers describe Coquetdale as "rich, clean and creamy with a melting texture and a long, fruity finish". The cheese won first prize at the Bakewell Show in 2006.

== See also ==
- List of British Cheeses
