= Beenleigh Blue cheese =

Soft blue cheese

Beenleigh Blue
- Country of origin: England
- Region: Devon County
- Town: Ashprington
- Source of milk: Ewe's milk
- Pasteurised: Yes
- Texture: Soft
- Fat content: 47%
- Dimensions: Round: 20 cm (8 in) D x 10-13 cm (4-5 in) H
- Weight: 3-3.5 kg (6.5-7.5 lbs)
- Aging time: At least 3 months

Beenleigh Blue is a thin-rinded, unpressed soft blue cheese made from pasteurised ewe's milk and vegetarian rennet produced by the Ticklemore Cheese Company in Ashprington, Devon, England. The cheese originated in the 1980s with a limited line by Robin and Sari Congdon, and thereafter became available to consumers throughout the year.

Originally made by Robin Congdon in the 1970s who was seen as one of the first pioneers in the 1970s to revive the tradition of milking sheep in the UK, it is now made by Ben Harris who is in overall charge of the dairy and the main cheesemaker.

== Composition ==
The cheese has been described as having a creamy texture with notes of fruitiness, mushroom and nutty flavour. Its composition is crumbly and moist, and it has an overall sweet flavour. After the blue veining within the cheese develops, it is wrapped in foil and then aged for at least three months.

== See also ==
- List of British cheeses
- List of cheeses
