= Sussex Slipcote =

English cheese

Sussex Slipcote is a fresh cheese made from ewe's milk by the High Weald Dairy in West Sussex, England. The cheese is usually round in shape with a very soft texture. There are two different explanations given for the meaning of "slipcote". High Weald Dairy explains that "‘Slipcote’ is an old English word meaning little (slip) piece of cottage (cote) cheese." Another explanation is that "slipcote" describes the cheese's tendency to slip out of its rind while maturing. Sussex Slipcote has been made in England since the Middle Ages, as described in Law's Grocers' Manual. The cheese won a Bronze award in the British Cheese Awards in 2008.

== See also ==
- List of British Cheeses
