= Harbourne Blue =

Brand of British goat cheese

Harbourne Blue is a goat's cheese produced by Ben Harris at Ticklemore Cheese Company in Devon, near Totnes, England. It is made by hand by using local milk. Maturation is around 10 weeks in which it forms a crumby, dense and firm texture with 48% fat content. It can easily overwhelm milder cheeses as the flavours are spicy and assertive.

== See also ==
- List of British cheeses
- List of goat milk cheeses
