= Renegade Monk (cheese) =

Artisan blue cheese made in England

Renegade Monk is an English rind-washed artisan soft blue cheese produced at Feltham's Farm in Somerset from organic cow’s milk.

It was the winner of Best British Cheese in the 2020 Virtual Cheese Awards, held in July 2020 in response to the cancellation of most of the British annual cheese awards as a result of the COVID-19 pandemic.

== See also ==
- List of British cheeses
- List of cheeses
