= Brighton Blue =

Blue cheese made in Sussex, England

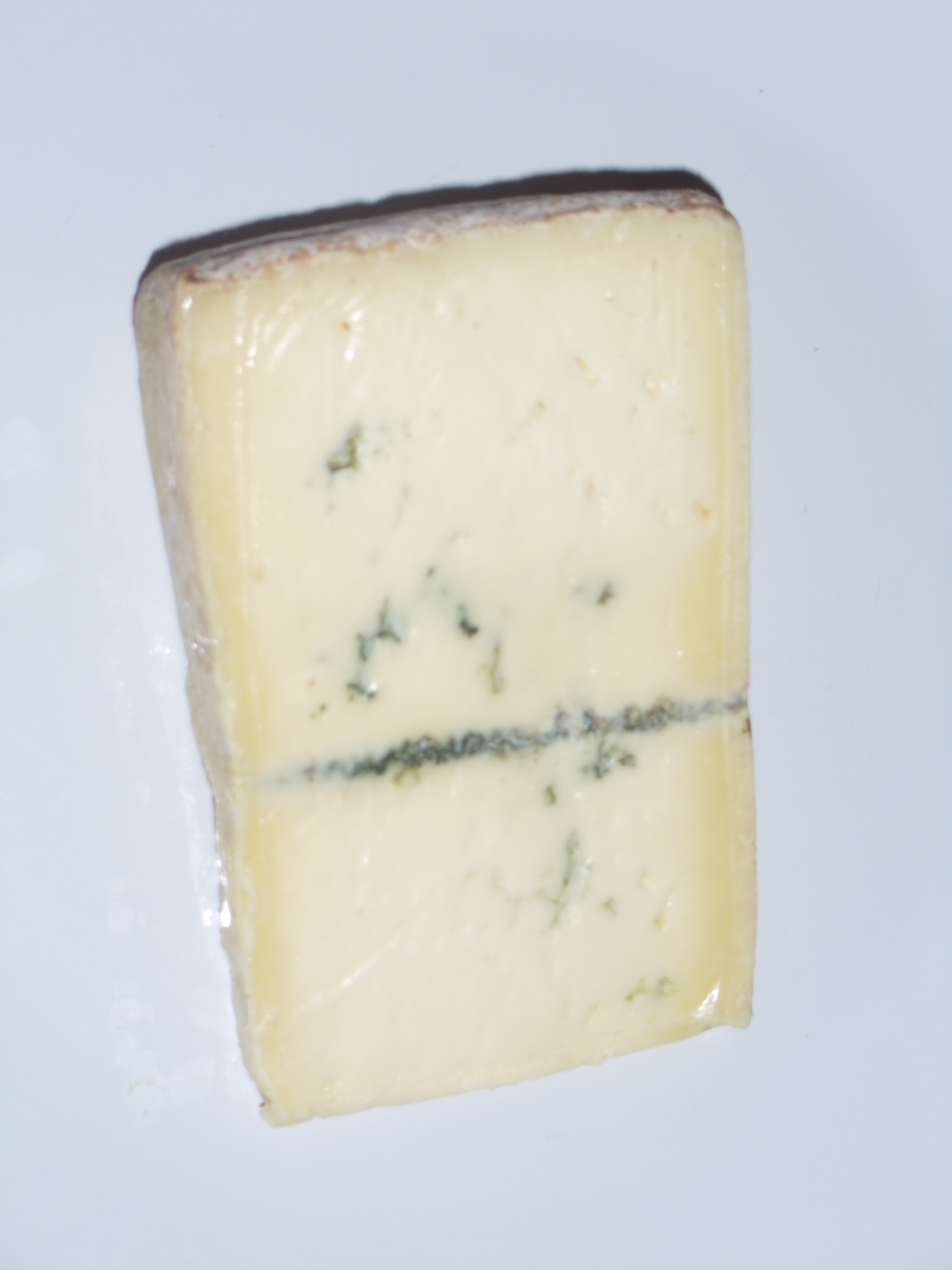
- Country of origin: England
- Region, town: region surrounding Brighton and Hove
- Source of milk: cow's
- Texture: Semi-hard

Brighton Blue is a blue cheese made in Sussex, England. It is named after the city of Brighton in East Sussex.

Brighton Blue is made from cow's milk only by the High Weald Dairy in Horsted Keynes, West Sussex. It has a semi-soft texture. It is yellow, with blue veins. The rind is edible.

== See also ==
- List of British cheeses
