= Berkswell Cheese =

Type of British cheese

Berkswell
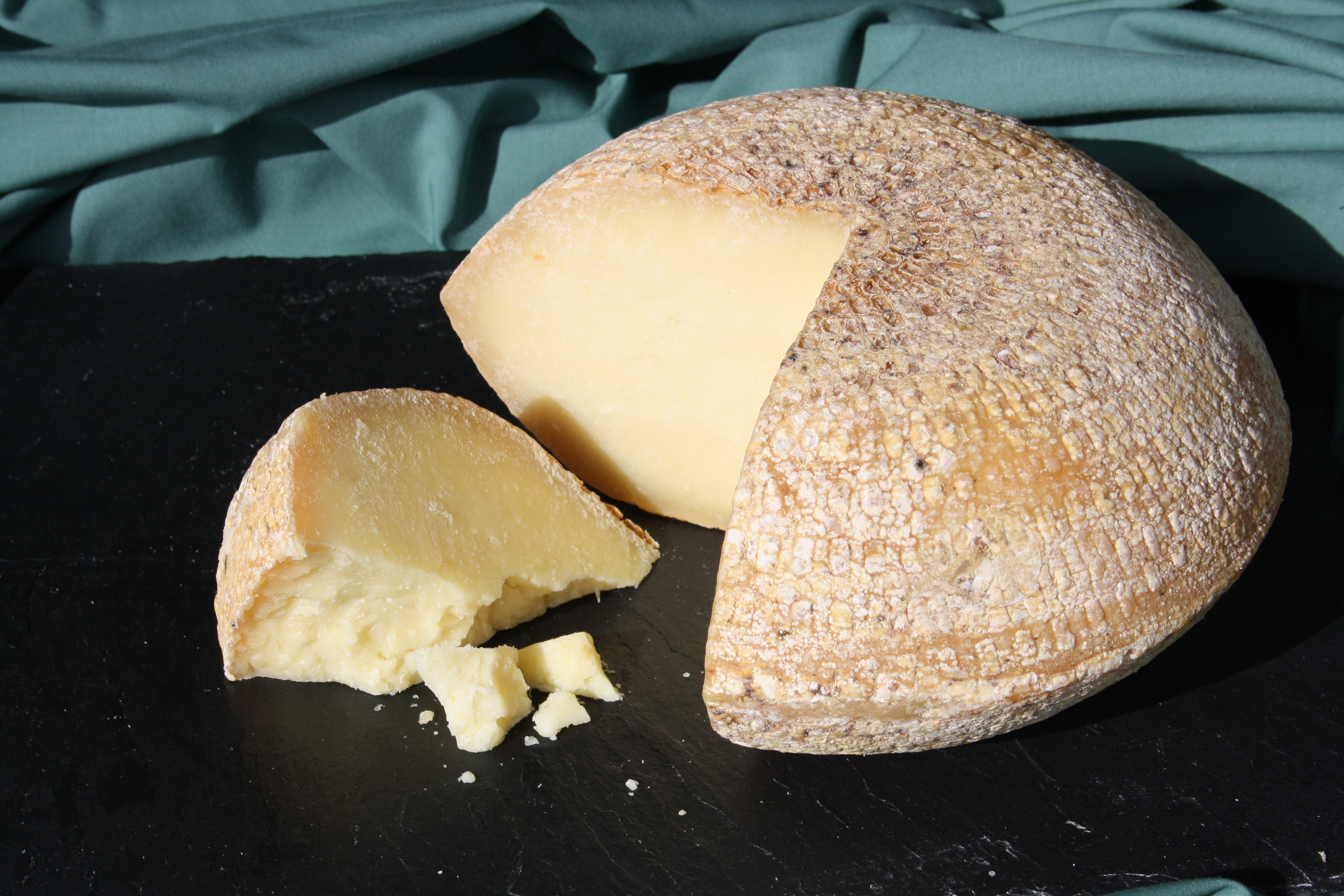
- Cut Berkswell
- Other names: Berkswell Ewe, Berkswell Hard
- Country of origin: England
- Region: West Midlands
- Source of milk: Ewes
- Pasteurised: No
- Texture: Hard
- Weight: 6 pounds (2.7 kg)
- Aging time: 4–8 Months

Berkswell is a hard cheese made at Ram Hall Farm near Berkswell, West Midlands, England. It is made using unpasteurised ewe milk and animal rennet. The moulds of cheeses are left in plastic kitchen colanders which give the cheese its distinctive shape. Berkswell may be compared to a mature pecorino. In 2017, Berkswell won Supreme Champion at the Artisan Cheese Awards.
