= Chevington cheese =

Cow's milk cheese made in Northumberland, England

Chevington is a cow's milk cheese, made in Northumberland, England, by the Northumberland Cheese Company. It was first developed by John W. Annett of Chevington West Farm, Northumberland in 1895 before being revived in 2003 as a slightly modified version of the original recipe that was found in public records. It is a semi-soft cheese, made from mould-ripened Jersey milk.

== See also ==
- List of British cheeses
