= Dorset Drum =

English cheese

Dorset Drum was a small farmhouse cheddar made in Dorset, England. The cheese was of a medium-strong flavour and the clothbound truckle was usually matured for between 6 and 9 months. They varied in size from 400g to 2kg but were always cylindrical in shape, hence the name.

The cheese was produced by Denhay Farm near Bridport in west Dorset. Production ceased and the last stocks were maturing in 2013. There is an export black wax-coated cheddar bearing the same name, but it is not the true Dorset Drum.

== See also ==
- List of British cheeses
