= Little Derby =

English cheese

Little Derby is a Derby-style cheese made outside Derbyshire, similar in flavour and texture to Cheddar, but without the annatto colouring used in Derby cheese.

One manufacturer of the cheese, Fowlers, is based in Earlswood, Warwickshire, having moved from Derbyshire in 1918. Their Little Derby cheese is made with pasteurised cow's milk, producing a semi-hard cheese with a fat content of about 48%. Annatto is not used, but the rinds of the 40 cm (16 inches) diameter wheels are washed with red wine to give an orange colour. The 10 kg (22 lb) cheeses are matured for seven months.

== See also ==
- List of British cheeses
