= Duddleswell cheese =

Type of cheese made in England

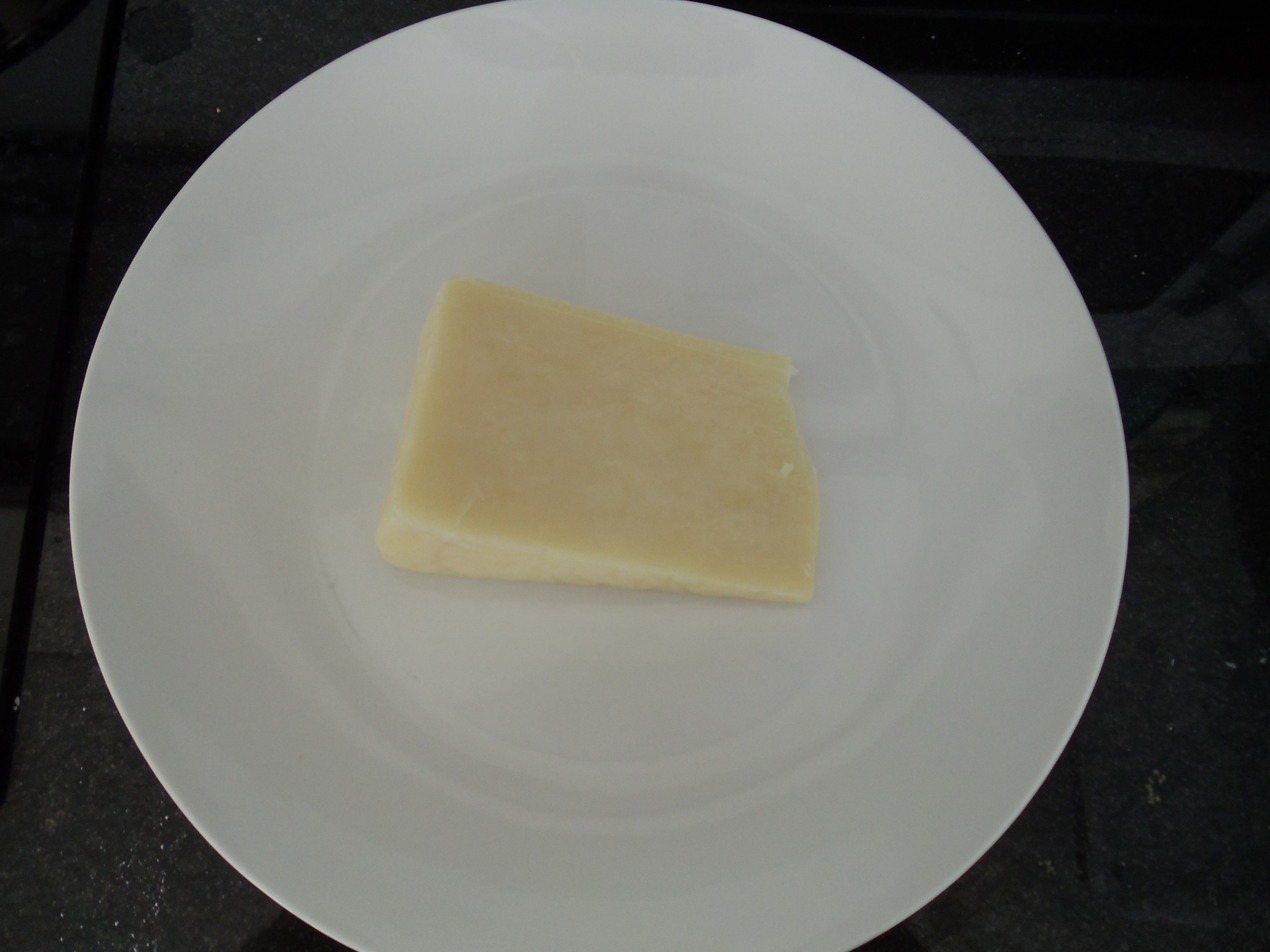
Duddleswell cheese (169 grams) on a white plate

Duddleswell is a type of cheese made in England.

It was created in 1988 at the High Weald Dairy in Horsted Keynes, West Sussex. It contains sheep milk and vegetable rennet. Once made, it is matured for five months. It contains 35% fat, 24% protein, 3% carbohydrate, 2% fibre, and 1.65% salt.

It received Gold at the International Cheese Awards in 2010 and 2011, and Bronze at the British Cheese Awards in 2010.
