= Ashdown Foresters =

Type of cheese

Ashdown Foresters is a cow's milk hard cheese made in England.

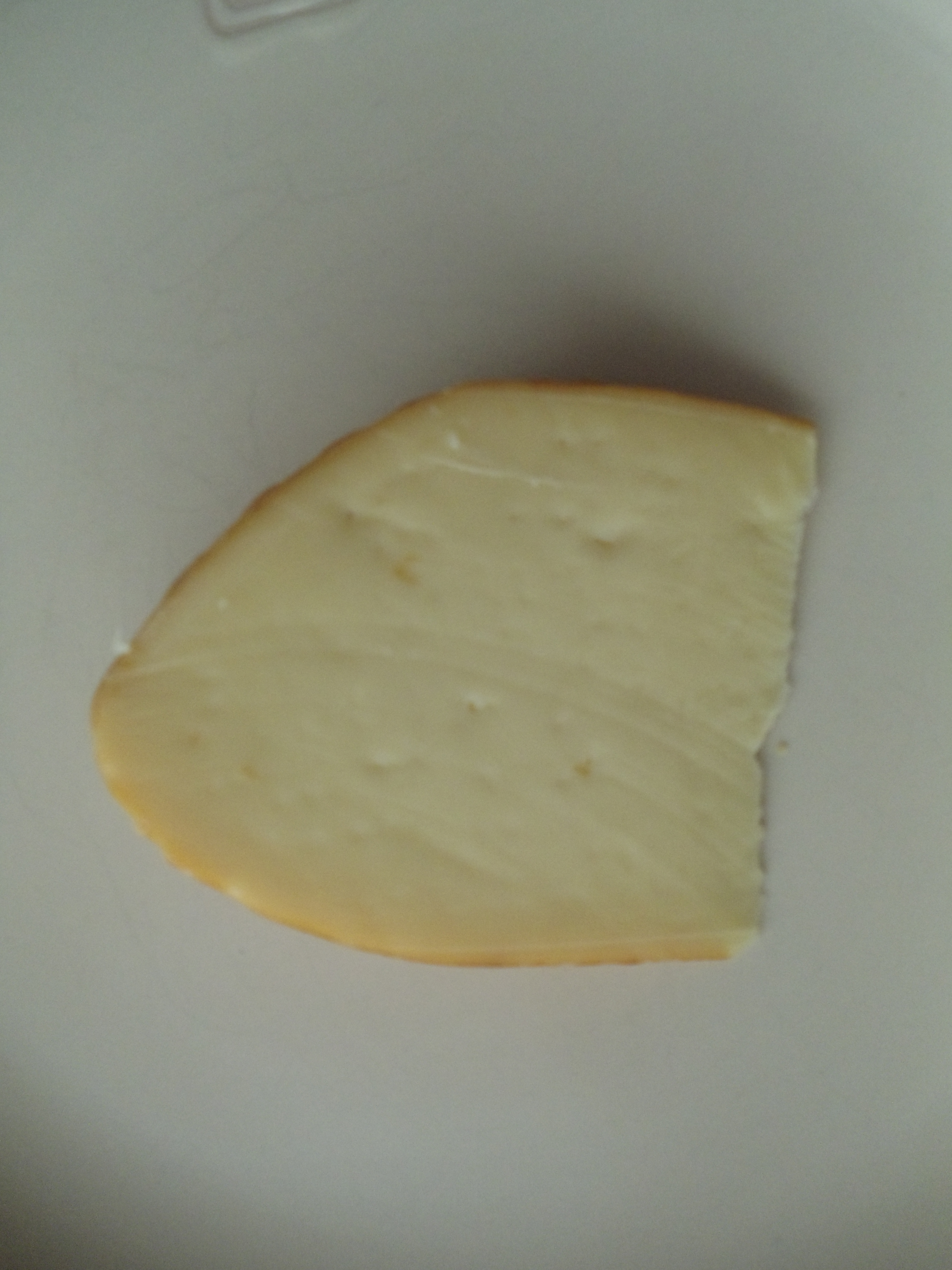
143 grams of Ashdown Foresters Smoked cheese.

== Overview ==
It was created at the High Weald Dairy in Horsted Keynes, West Sussex. It is named after Ashdown Forest. It contains pasteurized cow's milk and vegetable rennet. It takes eight hours to make and three months to mature. It has a sweet, nutty flavour.

It won the gold medal at the World Cheese Awards in 2008. It also won the gold medal at the British Cheese Awards in 2008 and 2009.
