= Fine Fettle Yorkshire =

British cheese similar to feta

- Country of origin: England
- Region: North Yorkshire
- Source of milk: Ewes
- Pasteurised: Yes
- Texture: Soft, slightly crumbly
- Aging time: 14 days (at least)
- Certification: None

Fine Fettle Yorkshire (formerly Yorkshire Feta) is a British cheese made from the milk of sheep produced in North Yorkshire by Shepherds Purse Cheeses. The owner, Judy Bell, was forced to change the cheese's name after an EU ruling meant that all feta cheese must be produced in Greece; its country of origin.
