= Wyfe of Bath =

English semi-hard cows' milk cheese

Wyfe of Bath is a semi-hard cows' milk cheese produced near the city of Bath. The cheese takes minor inspiration from the Dutch Gouda. Wyfe of Bath has a light caramel color, firm rind, and nutty, creamy, buttery center, and sweet and rich taste.

The name Wyfe of Bath is derived from the name of a character in Chaucer's Canterbury Tales.

The cheese won Gold at the 2017 Artisan Cheese Awards.
