= Shropshire Blue =

Scottish cheese

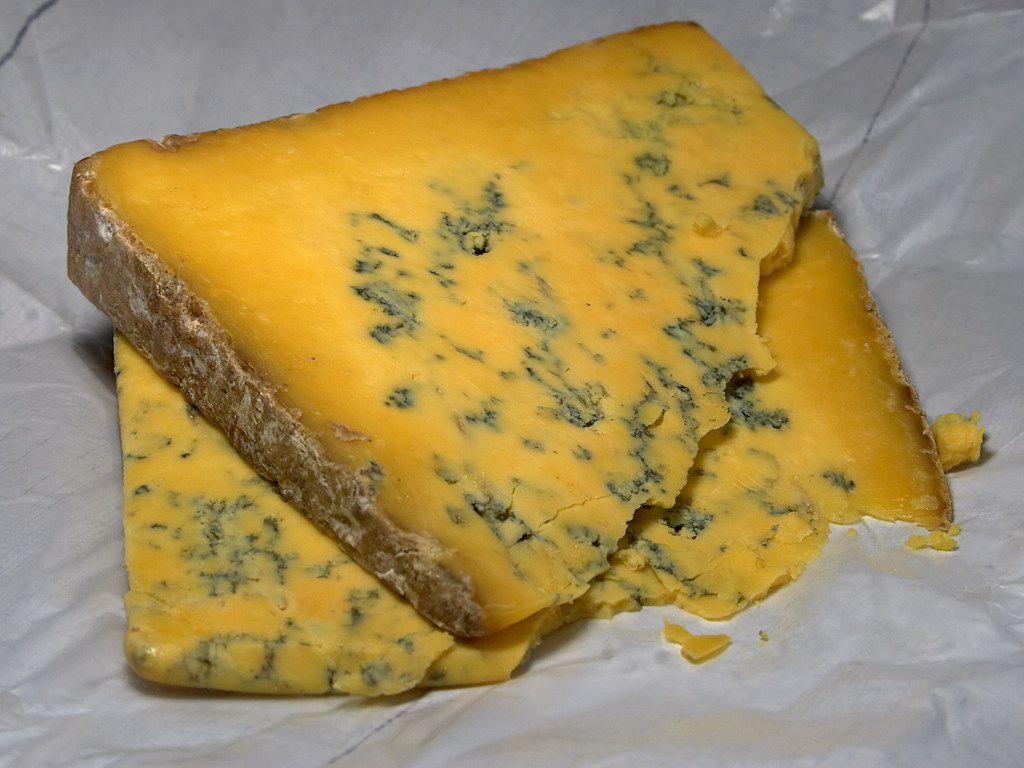
Shropshire Blue cheese

Shropshire Blue is a cow's milk cheese made in the United Kingdom.

== History ==
The cheese was first made in the 1970s at the Castle Stuart dairy in Inverness, Scotland by Andy Williamson, a cheesemaker who had trained in the making of Stilton cheese in Nottinghamshire. The cheese was first known as 'Inverness-shire Blue' or 'Blue Stuart', but was eventually marketed as 'Shropshire Blue', a name chosen to help increase its popularity, despite it having no link to the county of Shropshire.

An alternative claim to the first production of the cheese, from the Shropshire-based company Westry Roberts, suggests that the cheese originated in the county that it bears the name of in the 1970s; an archived article from 1977 would appear to back up this claim.. The Shropshire Star article published 25th October 2016, reporting the death of Dennis Biggins, the creator of Shropshire Blue, states "Dennis Biggins, 89, had a long and distinguished career as a cheese maker in Whitchurch for almost 70 years. He died on October 17 after a short illness."

There is an interesting article in which states..."It has had a difficult rise to being an accepted and sought after cheese. The recipe has been through the hands of 3 or 4 Artisan cheesemakers prior to being made by the Colston Bassett Dairies. It was the brainchild of Dennis Biggins a cheese factor based in Whitchurch, Shropshire. In the 1930s. he came up with the idea of adding naturally found Annatto food colouring to the milk, prior to it being heated, and created this unique and utterly delicious cheese. Shropshire Blue was “rediscovered” in the 1970s by Andy Williamson, a Scottish cheesemaker. Working at the Castle Stuart Dairy, he redeveloped the Shropshire Blue and sold it under the name of Inverness-shire Blue. That was until 1980 when the dairy closed down. The story of Shropshire Blue is then picked up by two Cheshire farmers and cheesemakers; Elliot Hulme and Harry Hanlin. They used the original recipe and kept Shropshire Blue alive, albeit for a short-lived period, when it was taken over by the Colston Bassett Dairies."

A variant, called Ludlow Blue, is now also being made in the county of Shropshire in a small artisan dairy. Ludlow Blue uses carotene as a colouring agent rather than annatto, which makes the colour more yellow.

== Description ==
Shropshire Blue is a blue cheese made from pasteurised cows' milk and uses vegetable rennet. The orange colour comes from the addition of annatto, a natural food colouring. Penicillium roqueforti produces the veining.

The cheese has a deep orange-brown, natural rind and matures for a period of 10–12 weeks with a fat content of about 48 per cent. Made in a similar way to Stilton, it is a soft cheese with a sharp, strong flavour and a slightly tangy aroma. It is slightly sour but sharper than Stilton and generally creamier.

== See also ==
- List of British cheeses
