= Tintern cheese =

Cheddar-based cheese, incorporating herbs

Tintern
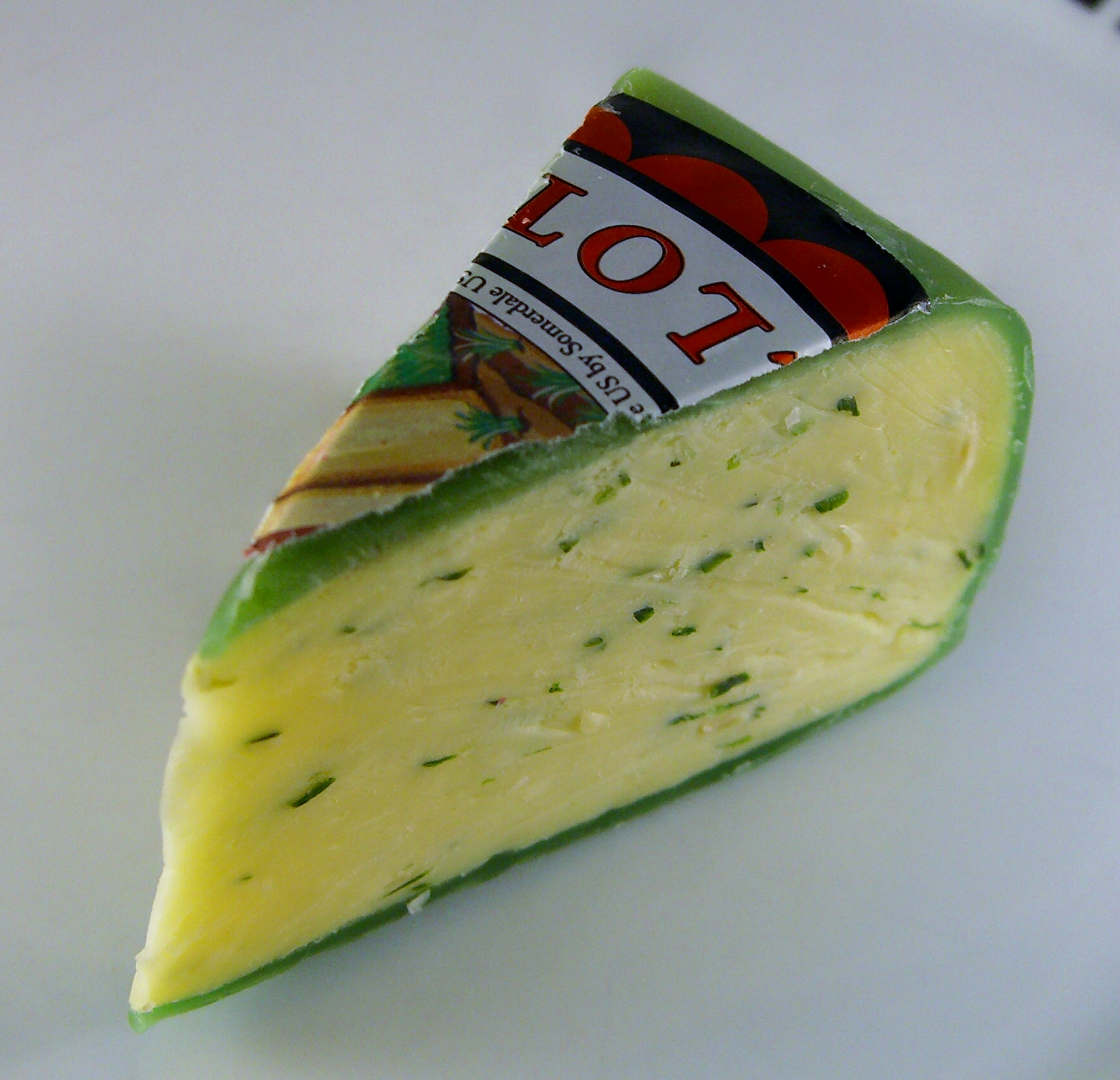
- Country of origin: Wales
- Region: Monmouthshire
- Town: Abergavenny
- Source of milk: Cows
- Pasteurised: Yes
- Texture: Soft
- Weight: 1.5kg

Tintern is a blended cow's milk Cheddar cheese, utilising Vegetarian rennet it is suitable for lacto-vegetarians. As a blended cheese, it is flavoured with fresh chives and shallots, the recipe was originally developed by Abergavenny Fine Foods in the mid to late 1980s.

The Abergavenny Fine Foods company sold the recipe and rights of Tintern to Croome Cuisine, effective from 31 December 2020. It is now Available in 150g waxed truckles and 1.5 kg whole wheels and is still sold in its distinctive lime green wax covering.

It takes its name from the village of Tintern on the River Wye, in Monmouthshire, Wales. The monks of Tintern Abbey managed a dozen or so monastic granges in the area, its agricultural hinterland.
