= Dorset Blue Vinney =

British blue cow's milk cheese

Dorset Blue Vinny
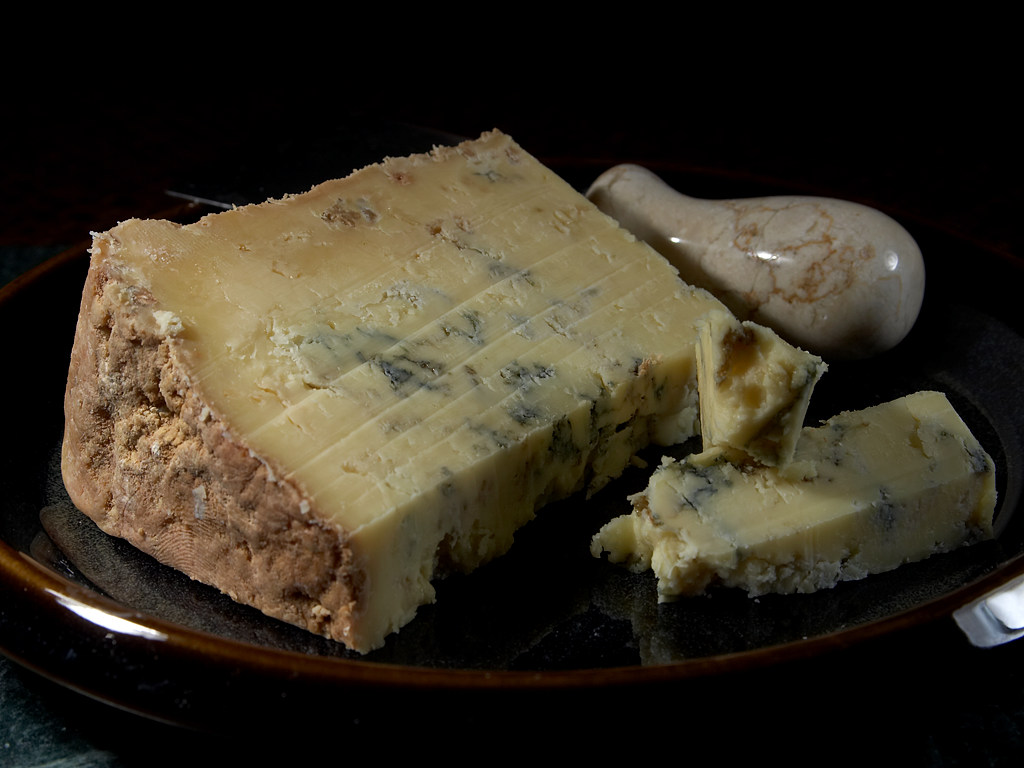
- Country of origin: England
- Region, town: Dorset
- Source of milk: Cows
- Pasteurised: No
- Texture: Hard, crumbly
- Fat content: 30%
- Aging time: 6 weeks
- Certification: Protected Geographical Indication
- Named after: Dorset[*]

Dorset Blue Vinny is a traditional blue cheese made near Sturminster Newton in Dorset, England, from cows' milk. It is a hard, crumbly cheese. It was formerly made of skimmed milk.

Vinny comes from the word vinew meaning 'blue vein'.

Blue Vinny is often made from unpasteurised milk. This is considered healthy by some and risky by others due to the potential for tuberculosis from infected cows passing into the milk. It has a strong taste and smell. The cheese is said to go well with Dorset knobs, another traditional product from Dorset.

Dorset Blue Vinny Cheese has been awarded Protected Geographical Status, ensuring only cheese originating from Dorset may use the name.

== History ==
Historically cheese in Dorset was merely a by-product of the much more lucrative butter market. Milk was of little value before the railways as it could not be brought to market before it went off, thus cheese and butter production was the main focus of dairy farms. Dorset butter was highly regarded in London where it fetched a premium price but making butter left the farmers with large quantities of skimmed milk which they turned into a hard, crumbly cheese.

Local myth describes how in years gone by, due to its supposed illegal nature, Blue Vinny would be left on the doorstep of those who ordered it on the black market.

While the cheese was a common farmhouse cheese in Dorset for hundreds of years, production nearly dried up after the Second World War, and was made in very small quantities on just a few farms. However, in the 1980s, Michael Davies from Woodbridge Farm in Dorset revived the old recipe, and the cheese is still produced on the family farm there, this time with whole milk.

== In popular culture ==
In his poem "Praise O' Do'set", the Dorset poet William Barnes asks,

Woont ye have brown bread a-put ye,
An' some vinny cheese a-cut ye?

== See also ==
- List of British cheeses
