= Hereford Hop =

English cheese

- Country of origin: United Kingdom
- Region: Herefordshire
- Town: Dymock
- Source of milk: Cow
- Pasteurised: Yes
- Texture: Creamy and firm
- Fat content: 50%
- Dimensions: 21.5 x 6cm
- Weight: 5lbs (2.25Kg)
- Aging time: 2 Months+
- Certification: -

Hereford Hop is a firm cheese, that has a rind of toasted hops. It has been produced since 1990 by Charles Martell, maker of Stinking Bishop. Since then, the cheese has been copied elsewhere by other producers. However, most of those tend to use minced and reformed cheddar, rolled in hop dust.
