= Cornish cuisine =

Cuisine from the English county

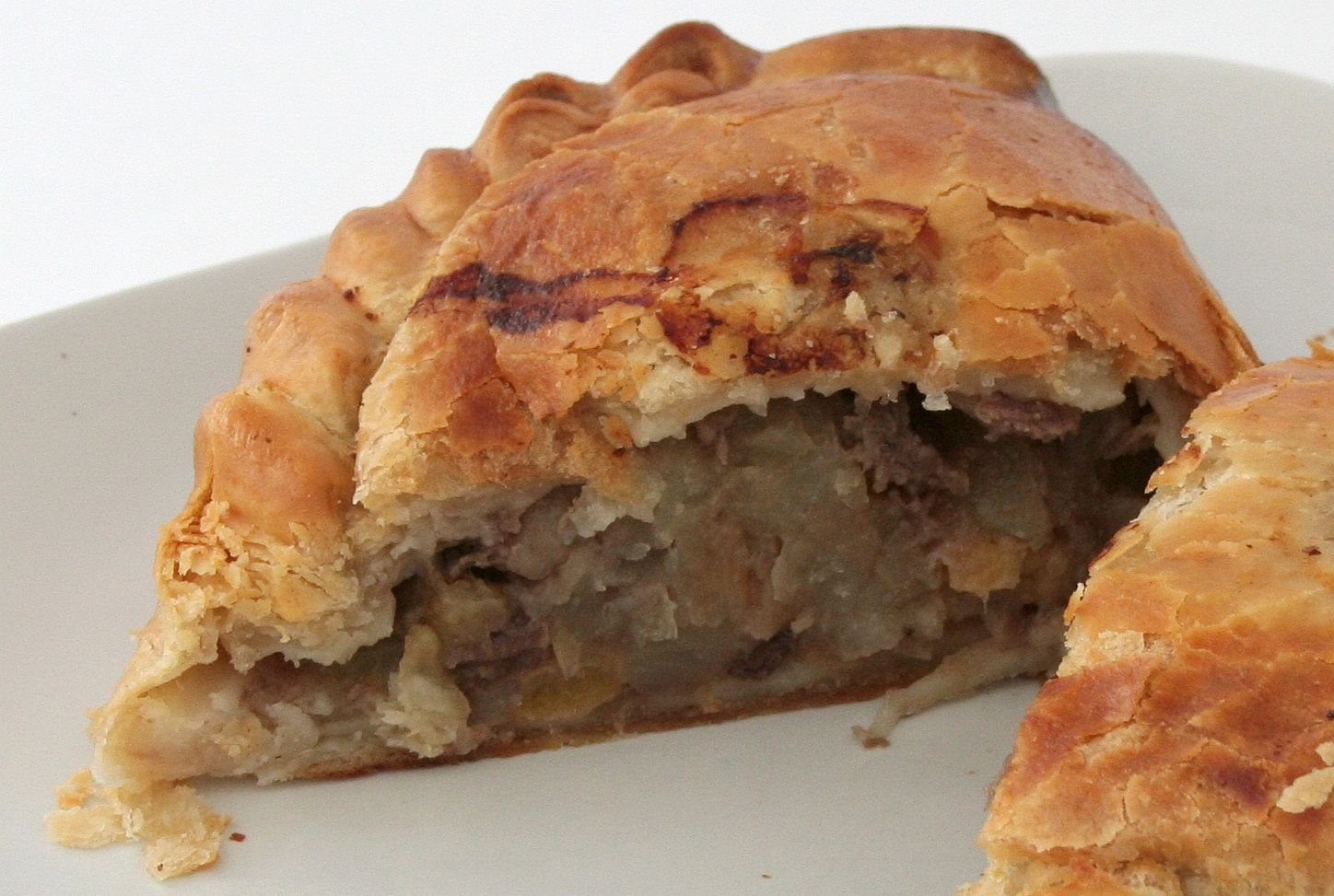
A Cornish pasty

Cornish cuisine encompasses the cooking styles, traditions and recipes associated with the English county of Cornwall and the Cornish people. It has been heavily influenced by the geography of the county as well as its social history.

Cornwall being a peninsula surrounded by historically well-stocked seas, with a significant fishing industry, has meant that fish dishes form a major part of the historical and modern recipes in Cornwall. The iconic dish of Cornwall, the pasty, has its roots in another historical industry within the county, this being mining.

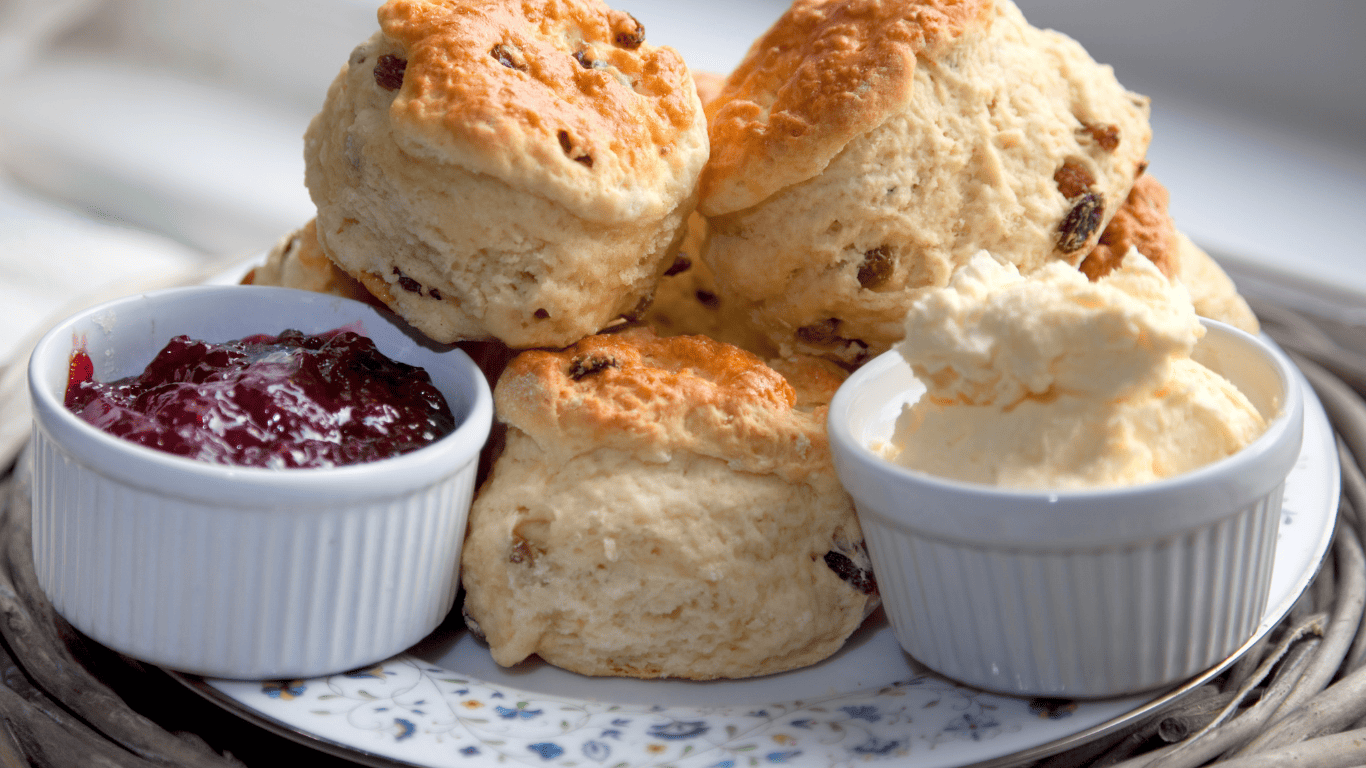
Cornish cream tea with jam first and clotted cream on top

Certain Cornish food dishes have been granted protected geographical status under European Union law, ensuring that they can only be labelled and marketed as "Cornish" if they are produced and mainly sourced within Cornwall. The Cornwall Food and Drink Festival promotes Cornish cuisine and produce. A major theme is the use of game foods as well as fish. A number of high-profile Cornish restaurants and hotels use game as part of their menu. This is highlighted at the Cornwall Food and Drink Festival by the Magnificent Seven Dinner, put on by seven of the best chefs in Cornwall.

Larger commercial producers of characteristically Cornish products include the bakers Warrens Bakery and Malcolm Barnecutts of Bodmin; and the creameries Davidstow Creamery, A. E. Rodda & Son of Scorrier and Trewithen Dairy of Lostwithiel.

== Dishes ==
Cornwall has a strong culinary heritage. Surrounded on three sides by the sea amid fertile fishing grounds, Cornwall naturally has fresh seafood readily available; Newlyn is the largest fishing port in the UK by value of fish landed.

Traditional dishes in the Lizard Peninsula are described in a pamphlet published in 1980. These include breakfast of "gerty milk" (bread and milk) with tea or cocoa; pasties made of pastry, turnip (swede), potatoes, beef and onion; boiled beef; squab pie of apples, onions and salt pork; "scrowled pilchards" (grilled over the fire on an iron plate); and "heavy cake".

Cornish food and drink was promoted in the Houses of Parliament in April 2009 following intervention from Mark Prisk MP, then Shadow Minister for Cornwall, as part of the Commons plans for a South West regional food week.

=== Fish dishes ===
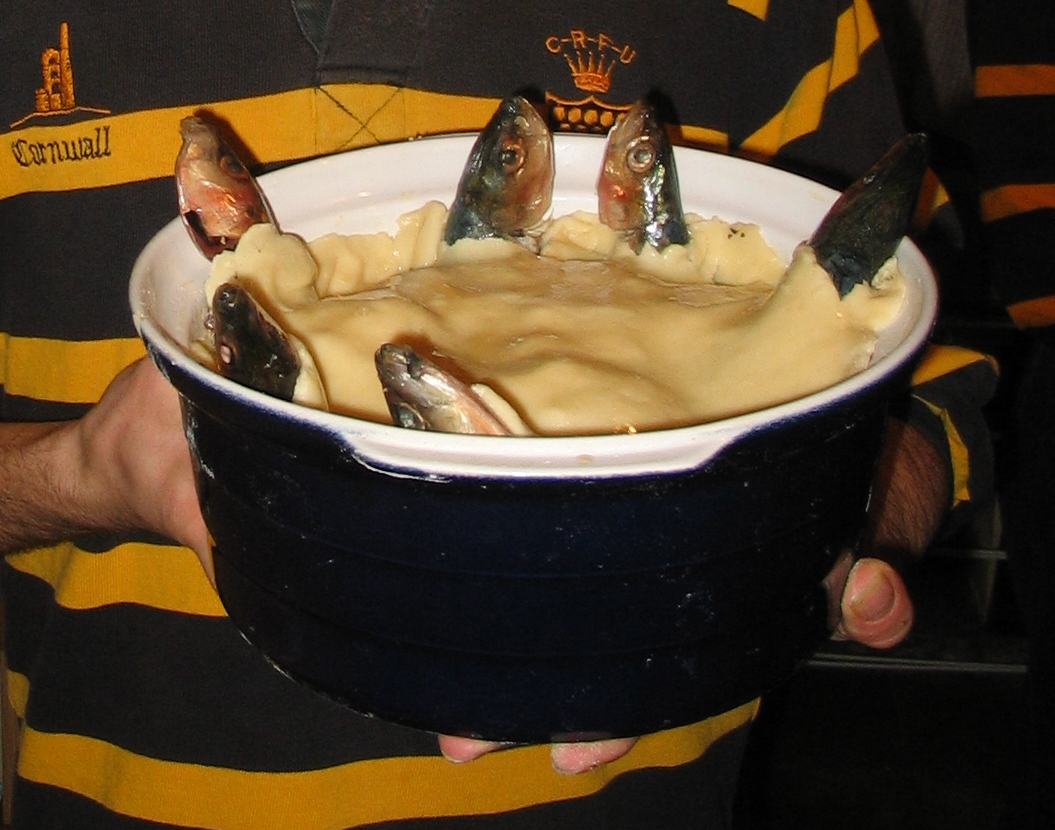
Stargazy pie with sardines looking skywards

One infamous local fish dish is stargazy pie, a fish-based pie in which the heads of the fish stick through the piecrust, as though "star-gazing". The pie is cooked as part of traditional celebrations for Tom Bawcock's Eve.

=== Pasties ===
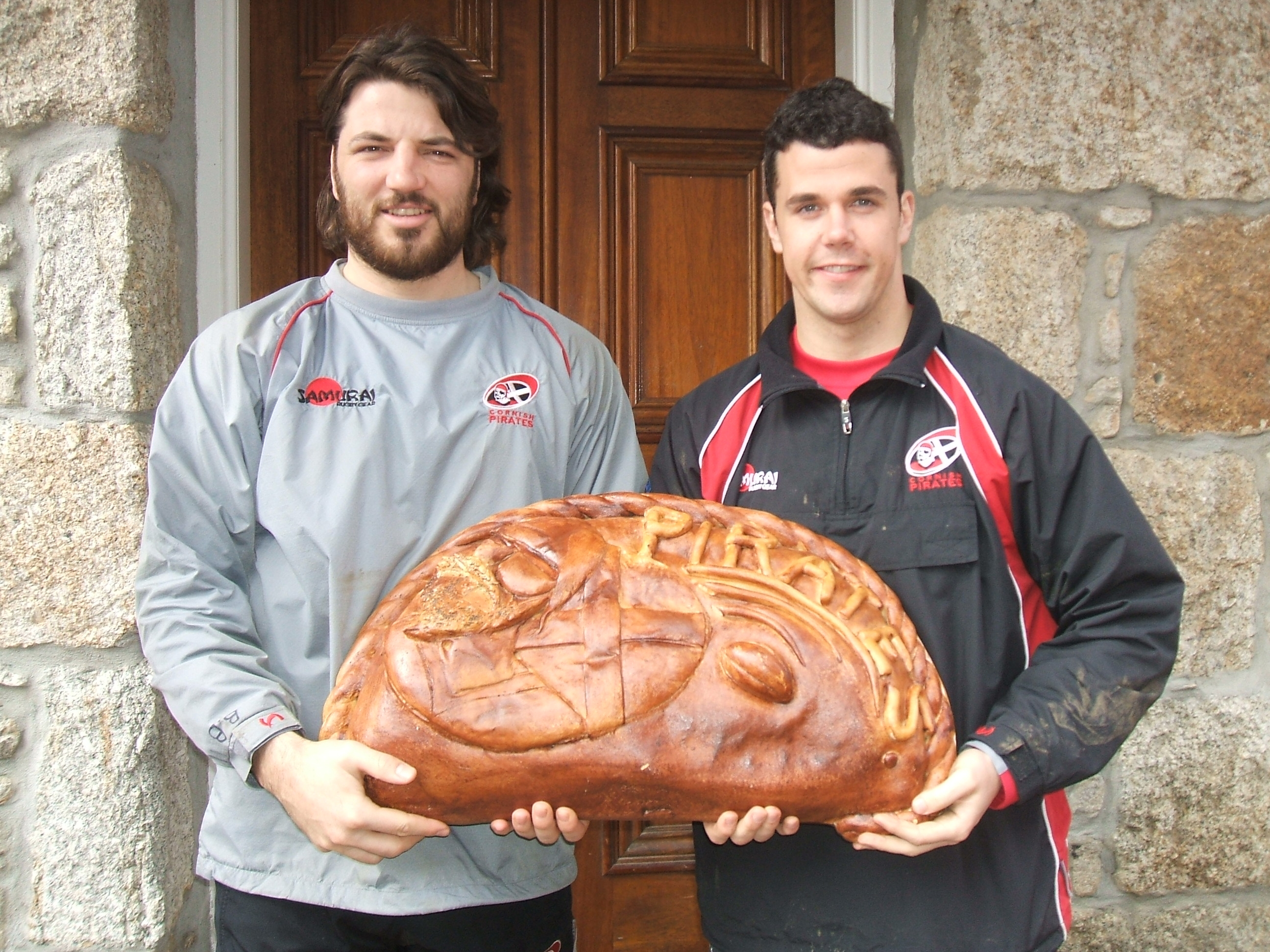
Cornish Pirates rugby players with a giant pasty that was paraded as part of the 2009 Saint Piran's Festival at Camborne.

Cornwall is perhaps best known though for its pasties, a savoury baked dish made from pastry. Today's pasties commonly contain a filling of beef steak, onion, potato and turnip (swede) with salt and white pepper, but there are also other variations, such as the cheese and onion pasty, Steak and stilton, vegetarian, and pork and apple

Historically, pasties had a variety of different fillings. "Turmut, 'tates and mate" (i.e. swede, potatoes and meat) describes a filling once very common. For instance, the licky pasty contained mostly leeks, and the herb pasty contained watercress, parsley, and shallots. Pasties are often locally referred to as oggies. Historically, pasties were also often made with sweet fillings such as jam, apple and blackberry, plums or cherries. The Pasty Shop and West Cornwall Pasty are among the Cornish chains that have popularised traditional oggies around the UK.

=== Meat pies ===
Squab pie is a traditional dish from South West England, with early records showing it was commonly eaten in Cornwall, Devon and Gloucestershire. Although the name suggests it should contain squab (young domestic pigeon), it in fact contains mutton and apples. The pie has become popular around the world, though outside South West England, it generally does contain pigeon.

In recent times, Ginsters Bakery has become a large-scale producer of meat pies.

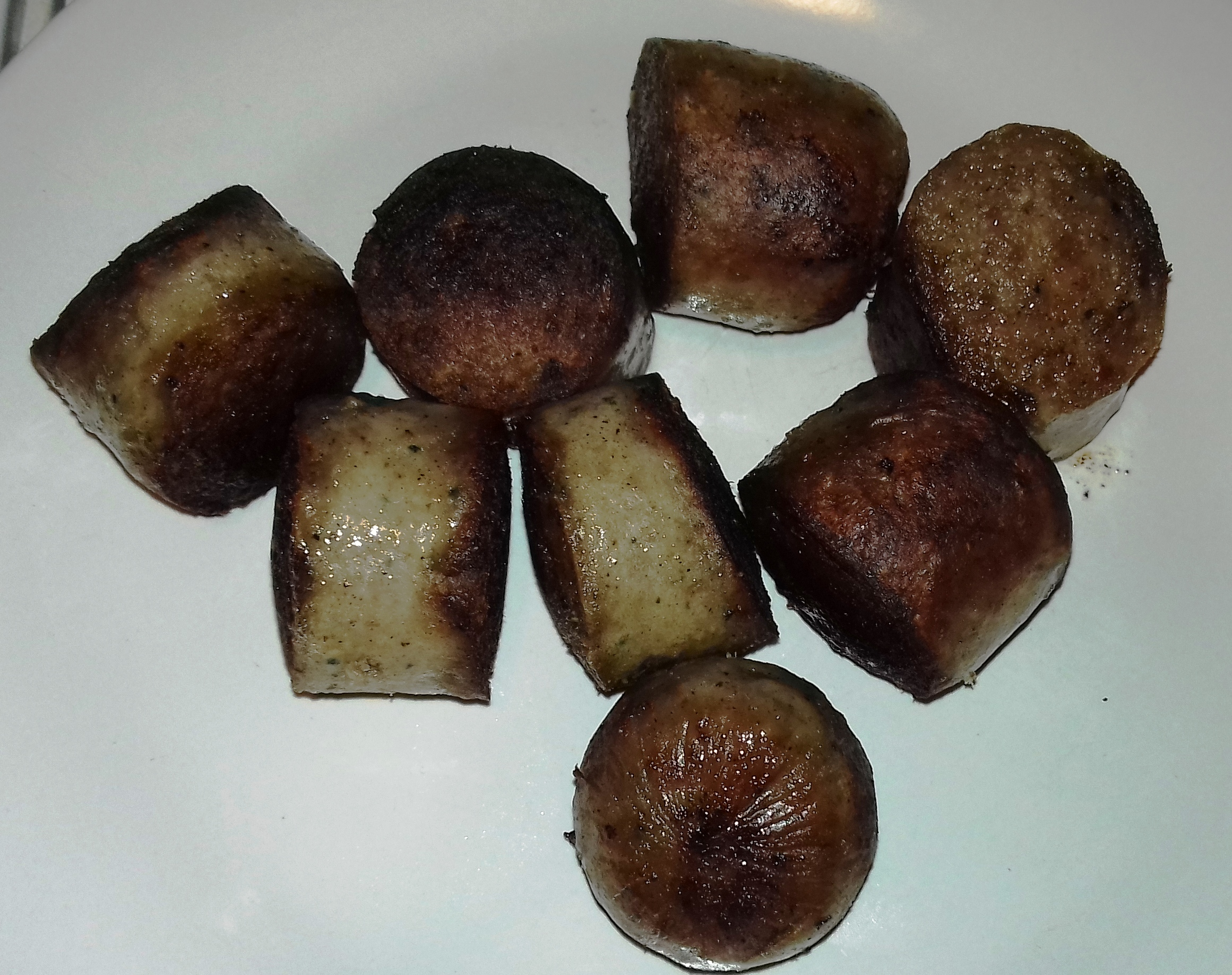
A hog's pudding, fried and ready to eat

=== Meat puddings ===
Cornwall has a variety of meat puddings. One example is hog's pudding, a type of sausage, with some variations being similar to white pudding. Another example is gurty pudding.

=== Dairy products ===
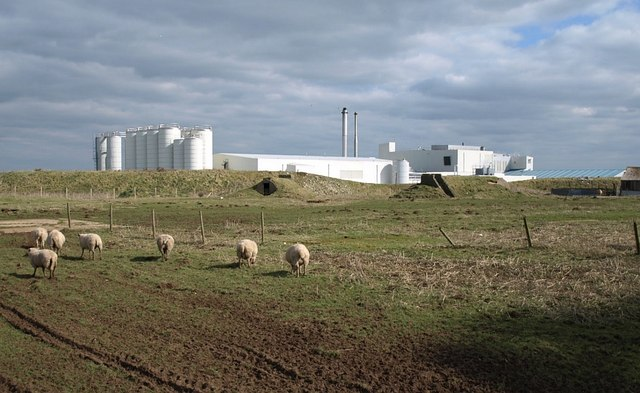
Davidstow Creamery

The wet climate and relatively poor soil of Cornwall make it unsuitable for growing many arable crops. However, it is ideal for growing the rich grass required for dairying.

==== Clotted cream and cream tea ====
leading to the production of Cornwall's other famous export, clotted cream. This forms the basis for many local specialities including Cornish fudge and Cornish ice cream. Cornish clotted cream is protected under EU law, and cannot be made anywhere else. Its principal manufacturer is Rodda's, based at Scorrier.

Clotted cream is a principal ingredient of a Cornish cream tea. Cream teas in Cornwall have its own traditions, such as clotted cream being served on top of the jam.

==== Cheeses ====
See also List of Cornish cheeses

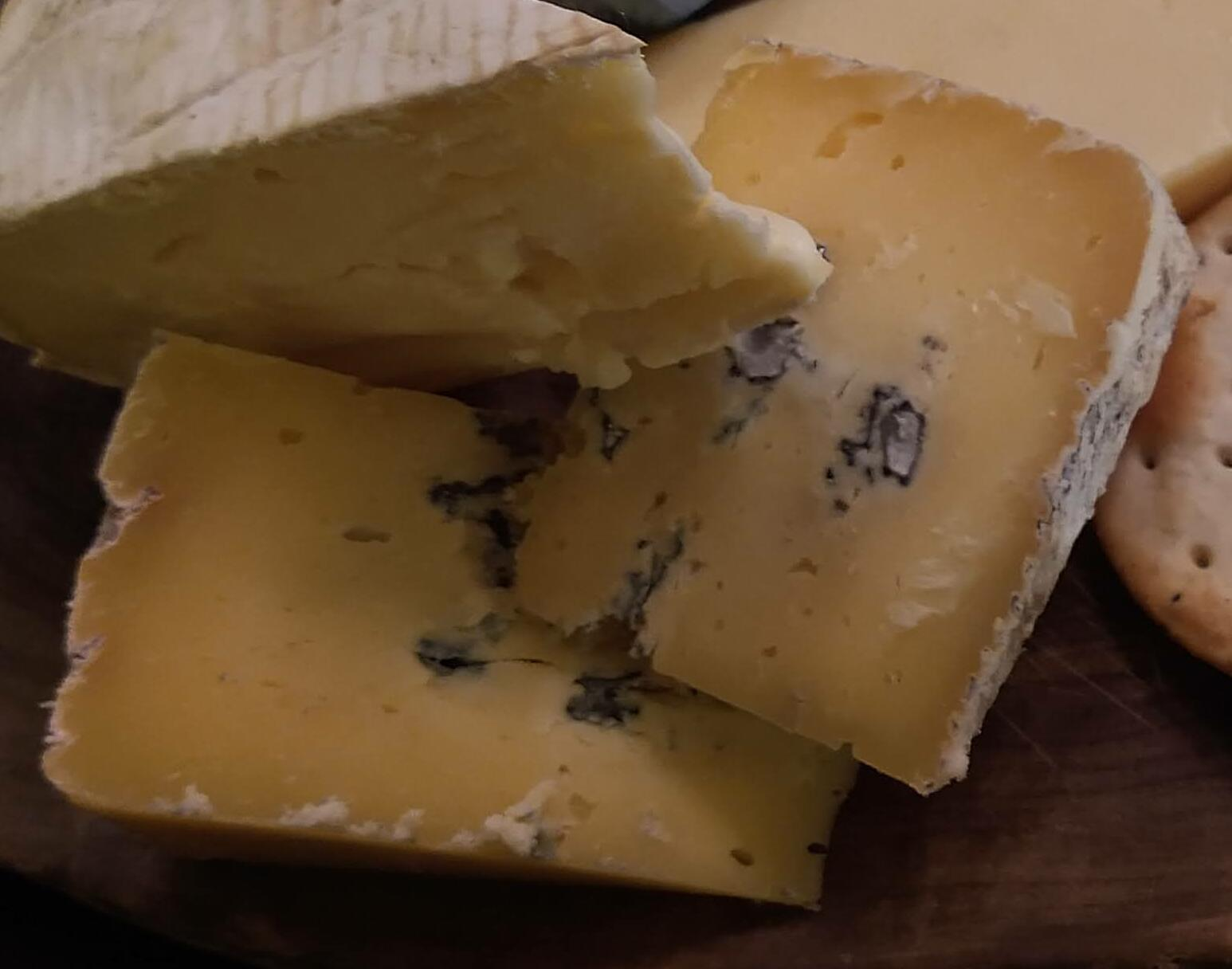
Cornish Blue Cheese

In 2004 there were nearly 60 varieties of cheese produced in Cornwall, and Cornish cheeses have won many awards.

Davidstow Cheddar and Cathedral City Cheddar cheeses are produced at Davidstow by Dairy Crest, using water ultimately from St David's Holy Well, next to the parish church. St Erth was the site of a large creamery operated by United Dairies; this was responsible for processing a large quantity of milk produced in Penwith.

Cornish Blue is a cheese made by the Cornish Cheese Company at Upton Cross and was recognised in December 2010 as the winning cheese in the World Cheese Awards. Cornish Brie is a brie-style, soft, white-rinded cheese produced by several makers in Cornwall. Gevrik is a soft, full-fat goat's milk cheese produced in Trevarrian near Newquay. The name means "little goat" in Cornish. Keltic Gold is a type of semi-hard cheese made by Whalesborough Farm Foods. Menallack and Nanterrow cheeses are made at Menallack Farm near Penryn. Tesyn is a type of smoked goat's milk cheese made by the firm Cornish Cuisine. Cornish Yarg is a semi-hard cow's milk cheese made in Cornwall. Before being left to mature, this cheese is carefully wrapped in nettle leaves to form an edible, though mouldy, rind. The texture varies from creamy and soft immediately under the nettle coating to a Caerphilly cheese-like crumbly texture in the middle. Modern production is at Pengreep Farm near Truro, by Lynher Dairies from an old recipe. Lynher Dairies also make Cornish Garland and Tiskey Meadow.

=== Cakes, sweet dishes and fruit ===
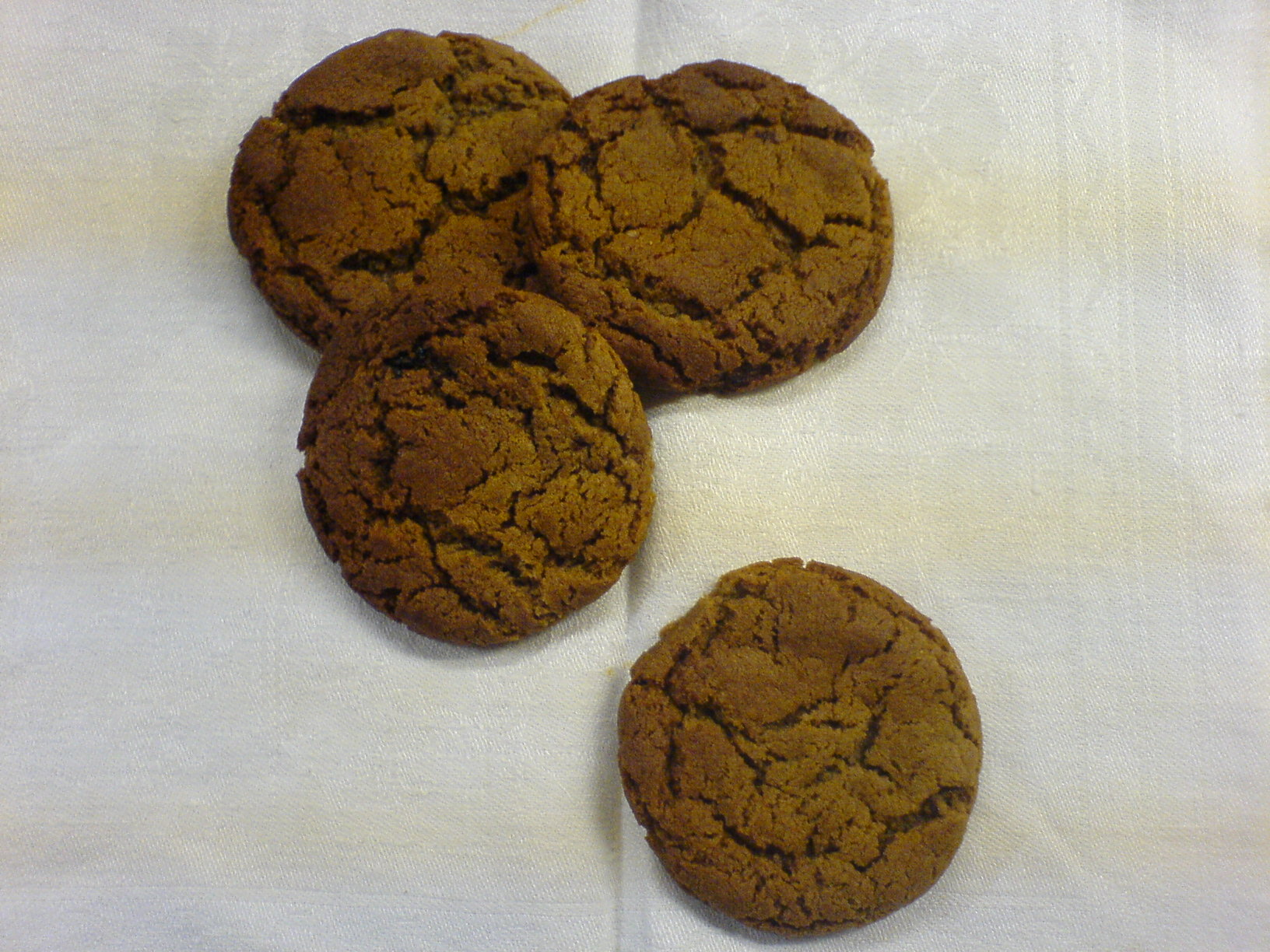
Traditional Cornish fairings

Local cakes and desserts include saffron cake, heavy (hevva) cake (similar to Welsh cakes), fairing biscuits, figgy 'obbin, or fuggan, scones (often served with jam and clotted cream) and whortleberry pie. Baking cakes using yeast is more common here than in the rest of England.

The Cornish Gilliflower is a variety of apple tree found at Truro in 1813 which was afterwards grown commercially. Other Cornish cultivars include the Cornish Aromatic and the King Byerd. Various fruit trees can be grown in Cornwall – the Tamar Valley was once renowned for its early strawberries and cherries. Whortleberries, damsons and blackberries can be gathered in some rural areas and homegrown produce can be used for jam-making or puddings.

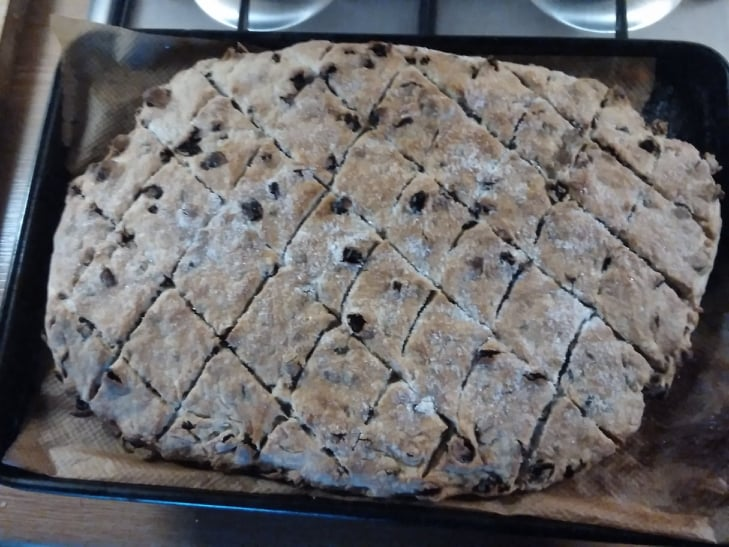
Heavy (hevva) cake

== Stoves and ovens ==
The Cornish stove (commonly known as the "slab") was found in most kitchens in west Cornwall. These stoves were supplied by a number of foundries in the district and were made of cast iron with brass knobs. The ironwork was kept looking fine with black lead. The foundries included Sara, Jenkins & Barnicoat of Camborne, Tippet, Terril & Rodgers of Redruth, Luke's of St Ives, Hill's and Radmore & Dart at Truro, Roberts's at Praze, and Toy's and Williams's at Helston. The doors to the firebox were either closed to heat the oven, or opened to provide a cheerful fire. Above the oven and firebox was the hotplate and some stoves had a built-in boiler to supply hot water. Once a week the blackleading would be renewed and the brasswork would be polished. The exhibits of the St Ives Museum include a reconstruction of a traditional Cornish kitchen. The predecessor of the Cornish range was the open hearth of which three still existed in the 1970s in the parishes of Feock and Kea. At that time several ranges by different makers were to be found at a house in St Agnes.

A clome oven (or cloam oven) is a type of masonry oven. It has a removable door made of clay or alternatively a cast iron door, and was a standard fitting for most kitchen fireplaces in Cornwall and Devon. The oven would be built into the side of the chimney breast, often appearing as a round bulge in the chimney. This bulge consisted of the masonry surrounding the oven, and was intended to be dismantled should the oven ever need to be replaced. During installation, they are surrounded by packed clay to prevent the actual oven cracking. As cast iron range cookers were brought into common use, it became standard practice to build a dividing wall to split the fireplace into two separate fireplaces, thus allowing access to the clome oven, as well as providing a space of the correct dimensions to fit a Cornish stove or similar. Bricks were the most common building material for this task, since the installation of a Cornish stove required a brick flue to be built up the back of the fireplace. Many clome ovens were preserved in situ in this way.

When large parts of Lanhydrock House were destroyed by fire in 1881 a new kitchen block was built next to the old house. It was unusual for a large Victorian kitchen to be housed in a new building like this. The house has been a National Trust property since 1953 and is open to visitors.

== Alcoholic beverages ==
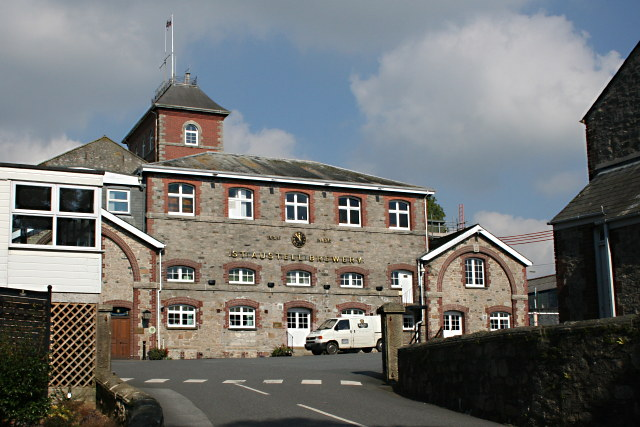
St Austell Brewery

There are many types of beers brewed in Cornwall – those produced by Sharp's Brewery, Skinner's Brewery and St Austell Brewery are the best-known – including stouts, ales and other beer types. There is some small scale production of wine, mead and cider. Spingo (meaning strong beer in Old English) is a generic name for a collection of beers brewed solely in the brewery of the Blue Anchor Inn in Coinage Hall Street, Helston.

Cider was traditionally made for farmworkers and Cornwall has a wide selection of local apple varieties. Healey's Cornish Cyder Farm near Truro brews and sells its own cider, brandy and country fruit wine produced on site. There are currently, at least 12 cider producers in Cornwall.

== Overseas ==
=== Australia ===
Cornish food, like the Cornish pasty, is still popular amongst the Cornish Australian communities. Former premier of South Australia Don Dunstan once took part in a pasty-making contest. Swanky beer and saffron cake were very popular in the past and have been revitalised by Kernewek Lowender and the Cornish Associations.

In the 1880s, Henry Madren Leggo, whose parents came from St Just, Cornwall, began making vinegar, pickles, sauces, cordials and other grocery goods based on his mother's traditional recipes. His company, now known as Leggo's, is wrongly believed by many to be Italian.

A boutique brewery operation in South Australia, Copper Coast Wines, produces traditional Cornish Swanky beer, a bottle-conditioned beer, for the biennial Copper Coast region Kernewek Lowender Cornish Festival, held in May in alternate (odd numbered) years. The name "Swanky beer" appears to refer to a Cornish home brew. During the 19th century, many Cornish miners emigrated to the Copper Triangle region of South Australia to work in the copper mines at Moonta. They brought local traditions, such as Cornish pasties and home-brewed beer they termed "Swanky beer", which was brewed from ingredients including malted barley, hops, yeast, brown sugar, ginger, raisins and soft rainwater. It was put into beer bottles with the tops tied down with twine and stored in the coolest place in the house until ready. It was served on festive occasions, such as Easter, Midwinter's Night (Bonfire Night) and Christmas.

=== United States ===
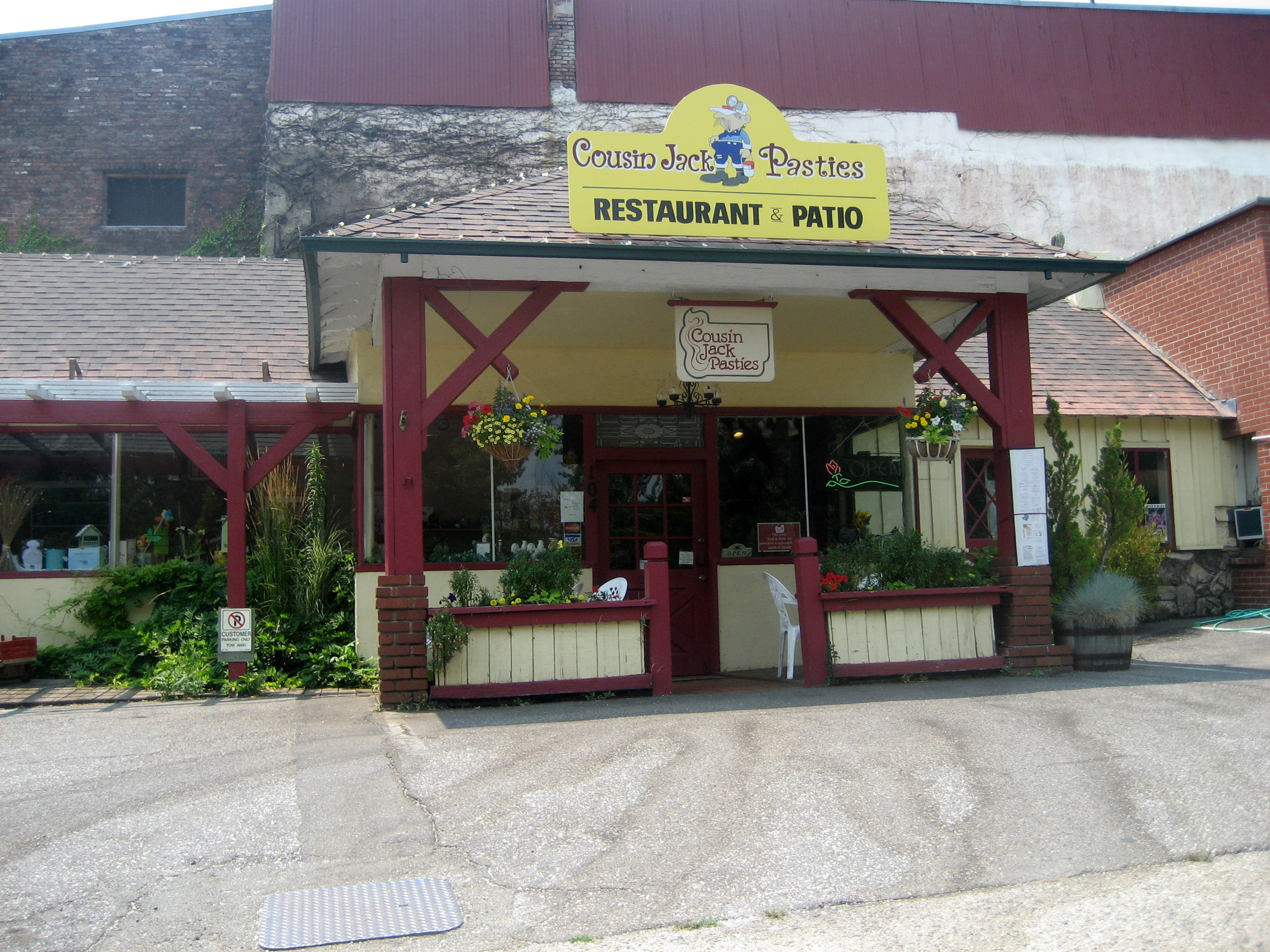
A "Cousin Jack's" pasty shop in Grass Valley, California

Some aspects of Cornish American cuisine are derived from Cornwall. At Mineral Point, Wisconsin, it is claimed that authentic Cornish food, such as pasties and figgyhobbin, are served and Cornish pasties are sold at ex-Cornish mining towns in America. Pasties can also be found in many Northern Michigan towns, such as Calumet, Michigan, which holds an annual Pasty Fest celebrating the dish. The city of Grass Valley, California, holds St Piran's Day celebrations every year, which along with carol singing, includes a flag raising ceremony, games involving the Cornish pasty, and Cornish wrestling competitions.

=== Mexico ===
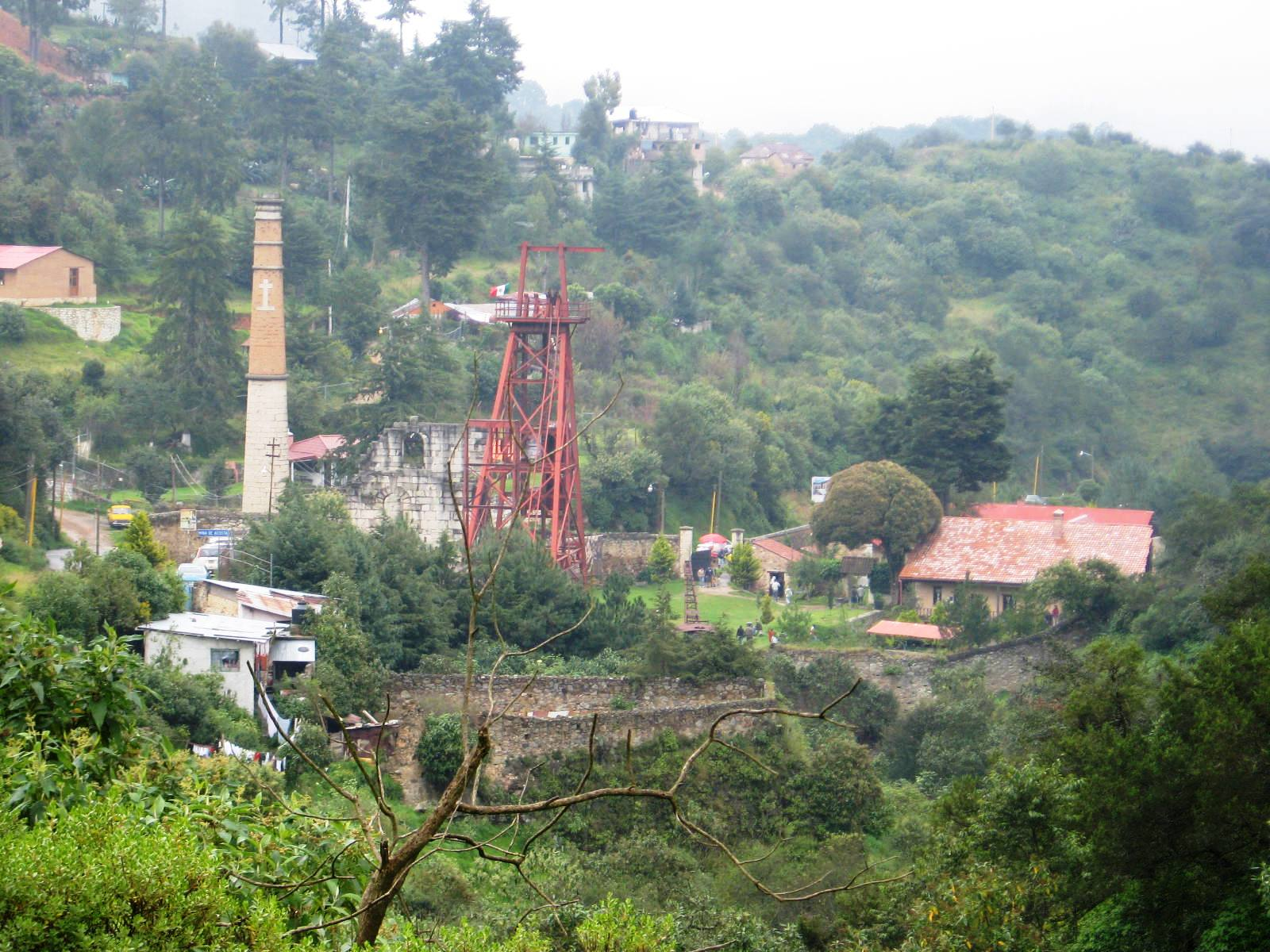
A Cornish mine in Mineral del Monte, Hidalgo, Mexico

In the State of Hidalgo in central Mexico, a local speciality originates from the Cornish pasty, called pastes, which was introduced by miners and workers from Cornwall who were contracted in the silver mining towns of Mineral del Monte and Pachuca. The majority of migrants to this region came from what is now known as the Cornish "central mining district" of Camborne and Redruth.

== See also ==
- Meadery
