= Cornish (surname) =

Cornish is a surname. Notable people with the surname include:

- Abbie Cornish (born 1982), Australian actress
- Albert J. Cornish (1856–1920), Justice of the Nebraska Supreme Court
- Audie Cornish (born 1979), American journalist
- Charles John Cornish (1858–1906), English naturalist and author
- Cyril Cornish (1891–1961), Australian politician
- D. M. Cornish (born 1972), Australian fantasy author
- Francis Evans Cornish (1831–1878), Canadian politician
- Fred Cornish (1876–1940), Wales international rugby player
- Gene Cornish (born 1944), American musician (The Young Rascals)
- Harry Cornish (1871–1918), English cricketer
- Hugh Cornish (1934–2024), Australian television personality
- James Cornish (1792–1865), British politician
- Jane Antonia Cornish, English composer
- Jessie J (born 1988) (real name Jessica Cornish), English R&B and Soul recording artist
- Joe Cornish (born 1968), British television personality
- Joe Cornish (photographer) (born 1958), British landscape photographer
- John Cornish (1837–1918), Inaugural Anglican bishop of St Germans
- Jon Cornish (born 1984), Non-Import Canadian Football League player
- Kimberley Cornish, Australian writer on Wittgenstein and Hitler
- Kirk Cornish, Bahamian politician
- Mary Cornish, New Zealand performing arts educator
- Mitch Cornish (born 1993), Australian rugby league player
- Richard Cornish (born 1942), Australian artist and art theoretician
- Richard Cornish (shipmaster) (died 1625), shipmaster accused of forcible sodomy
- Robert E. Cornish (1903–1963), American biologist
- Samuel Cornish, 1st Baronet (c. 1715 –1750), British naval commander and MP
- Samuel Cornish (1795–1858), African-American Presbyterian minister
- Sandy Cornish (1793–1869), civic leader in Key West, Florida; former slave
- Vaughan Cornish (1862–1948), English geographer.
- Virginia Cornish, American chemist
- William Cornish (disambiguation), various people
