= List of Cornish cheeses =

This is a list of cheeses from Cornwall in the United Kingdom. In 2004 there were nearly 60 varieties of cheese produced in Cornwall, and Cornish cheeses have won many awards.

== Cornish cheeses ==
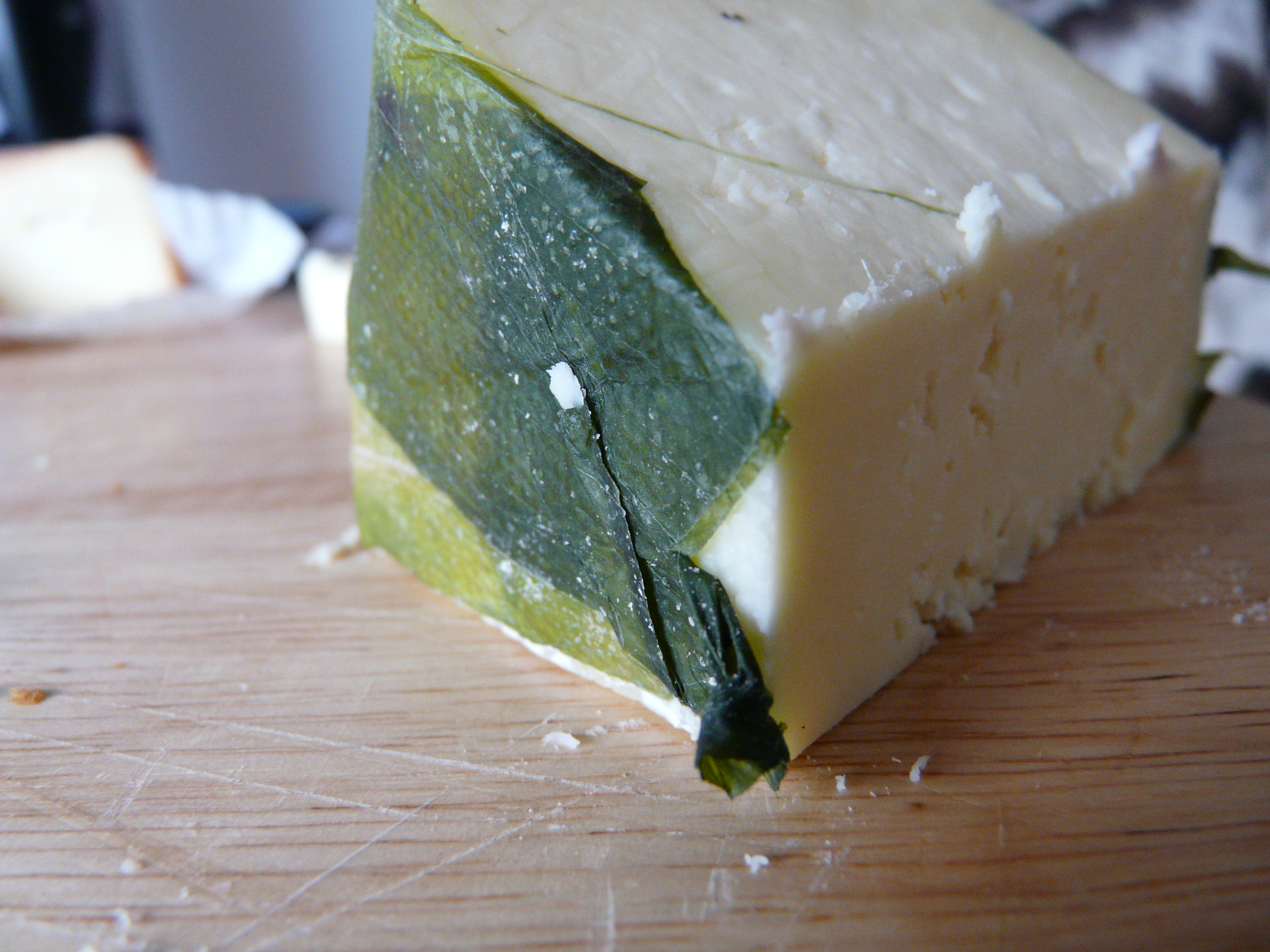
This Cornish Yarg is prepared with garlic, and is wrapped with nettle

- Blissful Buffalo
- Blue Moon
- Cathedral City Cheddar
- Cornish Blue
- Cornish Brie
  - Cornish Organic Brie
  - St Endellion Cornish Brie
  - St Agnes Brie
  - Farmhouse Cornish Brie
- Cornish Camembert
- Cornish Garland
- Cornish Gouda
- Cornish Herb
- Cornish Jack
- Cornish Kern
- Cornish Pepper
- Cornish Tarragon
- Cornish Tiskey
- Cornish Wild Garlic Yarg
- Cornish Yarg
- Davidstow Cheddar
- Edens Moon
- Full Moon
- Harvest Moon
- Helford Blue
- Heron
- Keltic Gold
- Little Stinky
- Menallack
- Miss Muffet
- Mrs Finn
- Nanterrow (ewe's milk)
- Tesyn
- Toppenrose Gold

== See also ==
- List of British cheeses
- List of cheeses
- List of English cheeses
- List of Irish cheeses
- Cornish cuisine

== Bibliography ==
- Jenny Linford, Great British Cheeses, Dorling Kindersley Ltd, 2008, ISBN 978-1405334365
