= Corish =

Corish is a surname. People with the surname include:

- Bob Corish (born 1958), English footballer
- Brendan Corish (1918–1990), Irish politician
- Patrick Corish (1921–2013), Irish priest and writer
- Richard Corish (1889–1945), Irish politician
- Vanessa Corish, Australian singer-songwriter

== See also ==
- Cornish (disambiguation)
