= Caerphilly (disambiguation) =

Caerphilly is a town in south Wales.

Caerphilly may also refer to:

- Caerphilly County Borough, a county borough in southern Wales
- Caerphilly cheese
- Caerphilly (Senedd constituency)
- Caerphilly (UK Parliament constituency)
- Caerphilly railway station
