= Cornish =

Cornish is the adjective and demonym associated with Cornwall, the most southwesterly part of the United Kingdom. It may refer to:

- Cornish language, a Brittonic Southwestern Celtic language of the Indo-European language family, spoken in Cornwall
- Cornish people
  - Cornish Americans
  - Cornish Australians
  - Cornish Canadians
  - Cornish diaspora
- Culture of Cornwall

Cornish may also refer to:

== Places ==
=== United States ===
- Cornish, Colorado
- Cornish, Maine, a town
  - Cornish (CDP), Maine, the primary village
- Cornish, New Hampshire
  - Cornish Flat, New Hampshire
- Cornish, Oklahoma
- Cornish, Utah
- Cornish Township, Aitkin County, Minnesota
- Cornish Township, Sibley County, Minnesota

== People ==
- Cornish (surname)

== Animals and plants ==
- Cornish Aromatic, apple cultivar
- Cornish chicken
- Cornish chough (Pyrrhocorax pyrrhocorax), a species in the family Corvidae
- Cornish game hen
- Cornish Rex, a breed of cat
- Lucas Terrier, a Cornish breed of dog

== Sports ==
- Cornish Wrestling, the ancient martial art, the "national sport of Cornwall"
- Cornish Pirates, a rugby union team
- Launceston RUFC, known as the Cornish All Blacks

== Other uses ==
- Cornish Art Colony, in Cornish, New Hampshire
- Cornish Assembly
- Cornish College of the Arts, an institution in Seattle, Washington
- Cornish pilot gig, a type of rowing boat
- The Cornish Trilogy, three related novels by Canadian novelist Robertson Davies

== See also ==
- Kornis, a family of the Hungarian nobility
- List of topics related to Cornwall
