= Stargazy pie =

Cornish dish made of baked fish

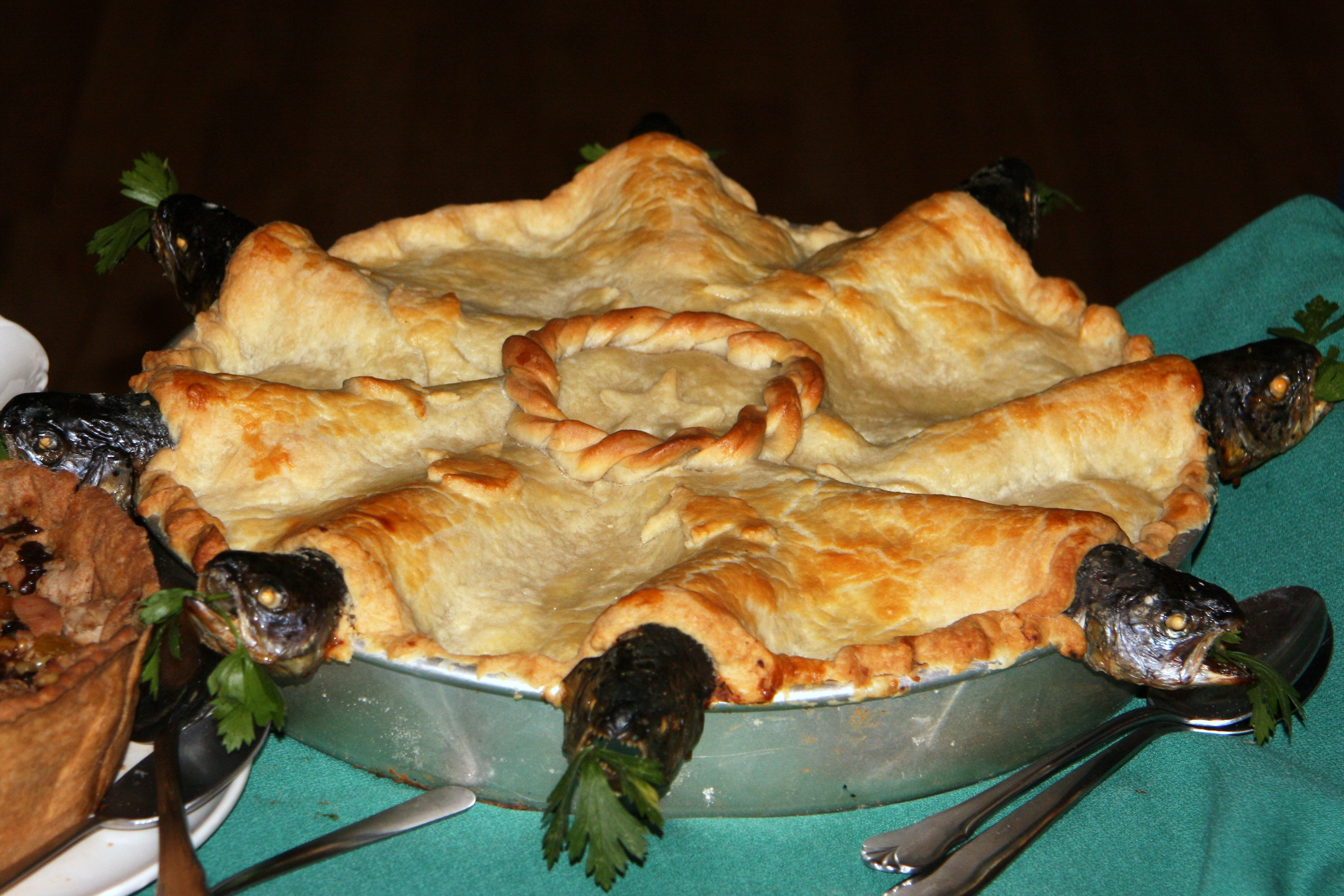
- A stargazy pie, ready to serve
- Course: Main
- Place of origin: England
- Region or state: Cornwall
- Invented: Before 1820
- Serving temperature: Hot
- Main ingredients: Pilchards or mackerel, pastry (shortcrust or puff), potatoes, leeks

Stargazy pie (also starry-gazy pie, starry-gaze pie) is a Cornish dish made of baked pilchards (sardines), along with eggs and potatoes, covered with a pastry crust. Although there are a few variations using other types of fish, the unique feature of stargazy pie is fish heads (and sometimes tails) protruding through the crust, so that they appear to be gazing to the stars.

The dish originates from the village of Mousehole in Cornwall and is traditionally eaten during the festival of Tom Bawcock's Eve to celebrate his heroic catch during a very stormy winter. According to the modern festival, which is combined with the Mousehole village illuminations, the entire catch was baked into a huge stargazy pie, encompassing seven types of fish and saving the village from starvation. The story of Bawcock was popularised by Antonia Barber's children's book The Mousehole Cat, which featured the stargazy pie. In 2007 contestant Mark Hix won the BBC's Great British Menu with a variant of the dish.

== Description ==
A merry plaas you may believe
woz Mowsel pon Tom Bawcock's Eve.
To be theer then oo wudn wesh
To sup o sibm soorts o fesh!

Wen morgee brath ad cleard tha path
Comed lances for a fry,
An then us had a bet o scad
an starry gazee py.

Nex cumd fermaads, braa thustee jaads
As maad ar oozles dry,
An ling an haak, enough to maak
a raunen shark to sy!

A aech wed clunk as ealth wer drunk
En bumpers bremmen y,
An wen up caam Tom Bawcock's naam
We praesed un to tha sky.

— Robert Morton Nance (1873–1959) (c. 1930)

Stargazy pie is a pastry-based fish pie which, by tradition, is filled with whole pilchards. It is critical that the pilchards retain their heads, so they poke through the pastry top. The appearance of the fish heads makes them look like they are "gazing at the stars", hence the name. The position of the fish allows the oil that is released during cooking to drain into the pie, adding a fuller flavour and ensuring the pie is moist. The celebrity chef Rick Stein suggested also poking the pilchards' tails through the pie crust to give the effect of leaping through water.

In spite of the fact that the British Food Trust describes the dish as being fun as well as amusing to children, it has been listed in "Yuck! Disgusting things people eat", a lifestyle feature by the New York Daily News based upon the book by an American author, Neil Setchfield. On Tom Bawcock's Eve it is served in The Ship Inn, the only pub in Mousehole, sometimes after a re-enactment of the legend.

== Origins ==
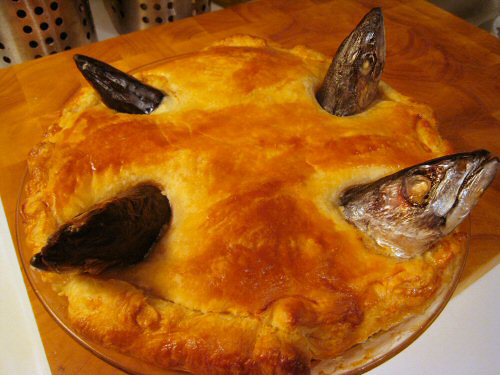
The pilchards must retain their heads.

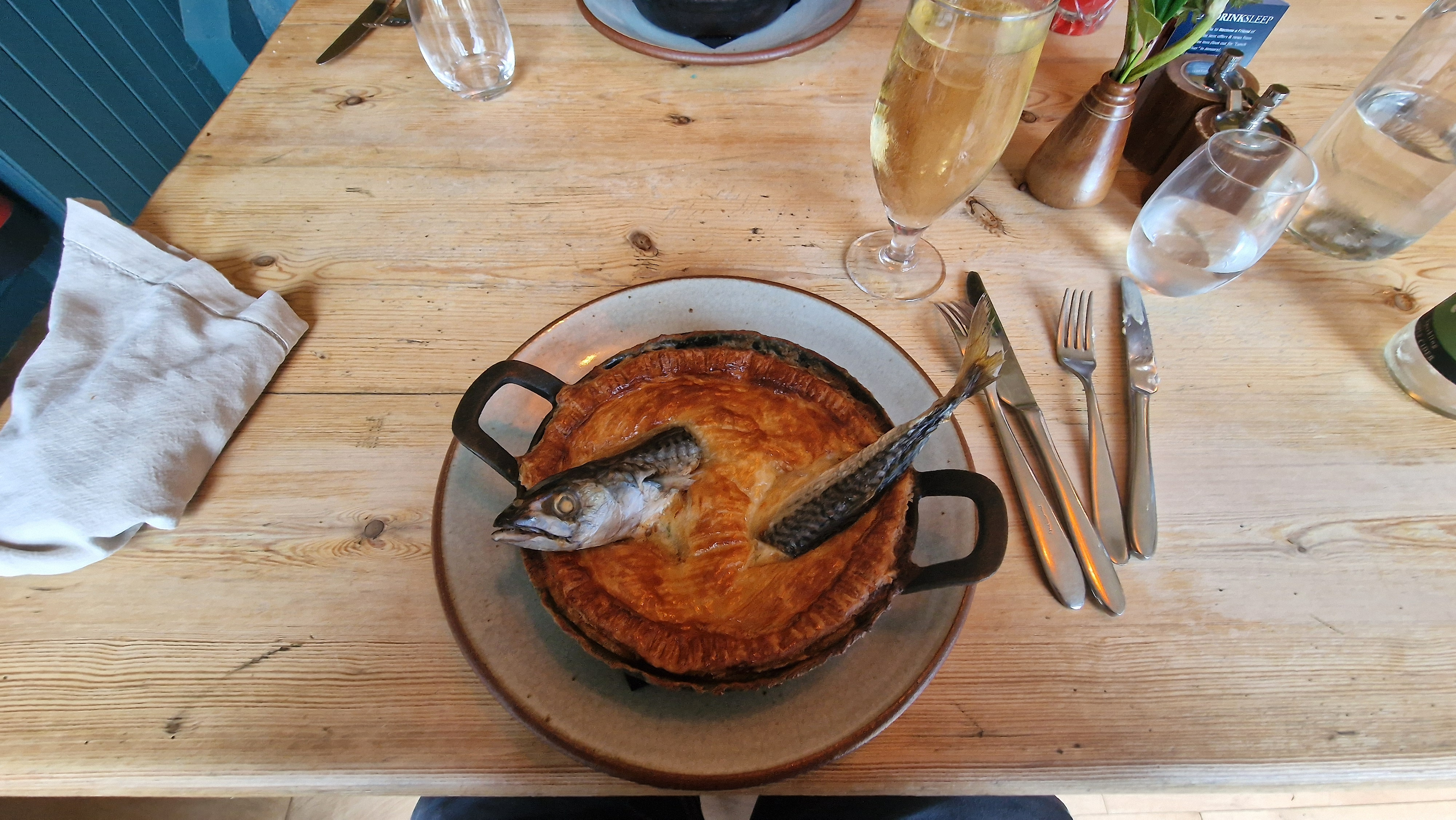
A stargazy pie served at the Old Coastguard Hotel in Mousehole

=== Folklore ===
The pie originates from the fishing village of Mousehole in Cornwall. As with many parts of Cornish heritage, a legend has appeared about its origins. In this case, the pie is served to celebrate the bravery of Tom Bawcock, a local fisherman in the 16th century. The legend explains that one winter had been particularly stormy, meaning that none of the fishing boats had been able to leave the harbour. As Christmas approached, the villagers, who relied on fish as their primary source of food, were facing starvation.

On 23 December, Tom Bawcock decided to brave the storms and went out in his fishing boat. Despite the stormy weather and the difficult seas, he managed to catch enough fish to feed the entire village. The entire catch (including seven types of fish) was baked into a pie, which had the fish heads poking through to prove that there were fish inside. Ever since then, the Tom Bawcock's Eve festival is held on 23 December in Mousehole. The celebration and memorial to the efforts of Tom Bawcock sees the villagers parading a huge stargazy pie during the evening with a procession of handmade lanterns, before eating the pie itself.

An older feast, held by the fishermen towards the end of December, included a pie cooked with different fish to represent the variety of catches the men hoped to achieve in the coming year. There is a possibility that Tom Bawcock's Eve is an evolution of this festival. Since 1963, the festival has been run against the backdrop of the Mousehole village illuminations, where the entire harbour is lit up, along with many other displays. One set of lights even represents the pie itself, showing fish heads and tails protruding from a pie dish underneath six stars.

There was a rumour that the entire festival was a fabrication by the landlord of The Ship Inn in the 1950s. However, festivities had been recorded by Morton Nance, an author on the Cornish language, in 1927 in the magazine Old Cornwall. His description was regarding the festivities prior to 1900, though he doubted the reality of Tom Bawcock, suggesting it was in fact "Beau Coc". He also went on to claim that the origins of the festival dated back to pre-Christian times, though it is unclear at what time the stargazy pie became part of the festivities. Morton Nance went on to restore the traditional song sung on Tom Bawcock's Eve, played to the local tune "wedding March".

A legend surrounding stargazy pie, along with the other unusual pies of Cornwall, is that they were the reason that the Devil never came to Cornwall. In his book Popular Romances of the West of England; or, The drolls, traditions, and superstitions of old Cornwall, a collection of Cornish traditions, Robert Hunt explains that the Devil crossed the River Tamar to Torpoint. The chapter, entitled "The Devil's Coits, etc", reasons that the Devil discovered the Cornish would put anything in a pie and decided to leave before they took a fancy to a "devilly" pie, returning to Devon.

=== Earliest accounts ===
Printed accounts of stargazy pie do not predate the 19th century. One of the earliest print accounts of the pie, in William Sandys' Specimens Of Cornish Provincial Dialect (1846), describes it as being made with pilchards and leeks. It also appears in Frances Eliza Millett Notley's Patience Caerhydon (1868–69), where the starry-gazy pie is made with mackerel. A poem is found in The North Georgia Gazette, and Winter Chronicle, a newspaper printed by and for the crew of Edward Parry's Arctic survey of 1819–20:

Or like that fish so long, so much renown'd,
That on the Cornish coast in swarms abound,
A pilchard hight, who, quite as snug as we,
Peeps through the crust, the moon and stars to see;
And hence, by people, keen and sharp as razors,
Have they, as we, been oft-times call'd star-gazers.

== Recipes ==
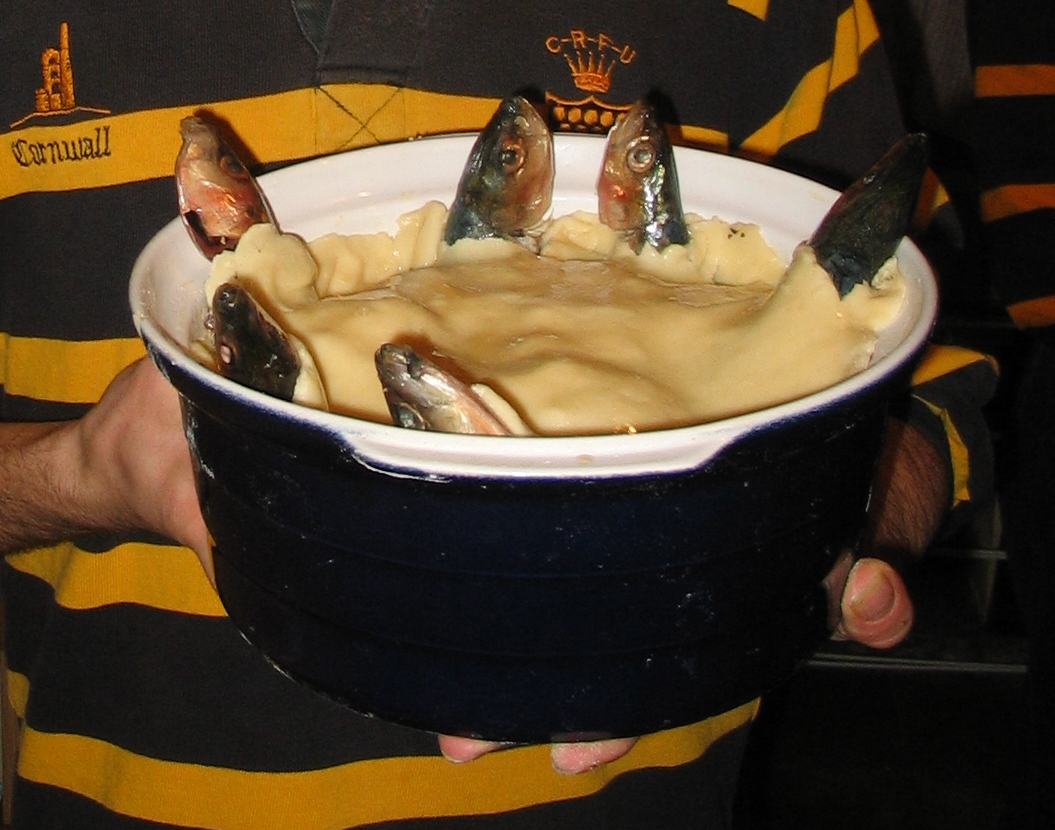
Stargazy pie, with sardines looking upwards before it is baked in the oven

The original pie in the legend included sand eels, horse mackerel, pilchards, herring, dogfish and ling along with a seventh fish. In a traditional pie, the primary ingredient is the pilchard (sardine), although mackerel or herring is used as a substitute. Richard Stevenson, chef at The Ship Inn in Mousehole, suggests that any white fish will work for the filling, while pilchards or herring can be added for the presentation. Prior to putting it in the pie the fish should be skinned and boned (except the head and tail) to make it easier to eat. Along with the fish, the other traditional ingredients are thickened milk, eggs and boiled potatoes.

There are many recipe variations around the traditional ingredients, some of which include hard-boiled eggs, bacon, onion, mustard or white wine. Other alternatives to the main fish can be crayfish and rabbit or mutton. The stargazy pie is always topped with a pastry lid, generally shortcrust but sometimes puff pastry, through which the fish heads and sometimes tails protrude.

For presentation, one suggestion is that the pilchards be arranged with their tails toward the centre of the pie and their heads poking up through the crust around the edge. As it includes potatoes and pastry, the pie can be served on its own or with crusty bread, sometimes with vegetables. Other suggested accompaniments are Cornish Yarg cheese, rhubarb chutney, poached eggs or a slice of lemon.

== In popular culture ==
Cornish singer Brenda Wootton recorded an album Starry-Gazey Pie with Rob Bartlett in 1975 for Sentinel Records. "Tom Bawcock's Eve" appears as the last track on the first side. Nancy Kerr and James Fagan recorded an album and track Starry Gazy Pie in 1997. The Silver Seas recorded an album called Starry Gazey Pie in 2004. Jim Causley references "starry-gazey pie" on the track "My Young Man's a Cornishman" on his 2013 album Cyprus Well. The song comes from a poem by his distant relative Charles Causley (1917–2003). Stargazy pie is mentioned as a celebrational meal (served with ale) in series 4 episode 6 of the BBC show 'Poldark' (part of the 'Masterpiece Theatre' collective) which ran from 2015 to 2019.

== See also ==
- Culture of Cornwall
- List of pies, tarts and flans
