= Clome oven =

Type of masonry oven

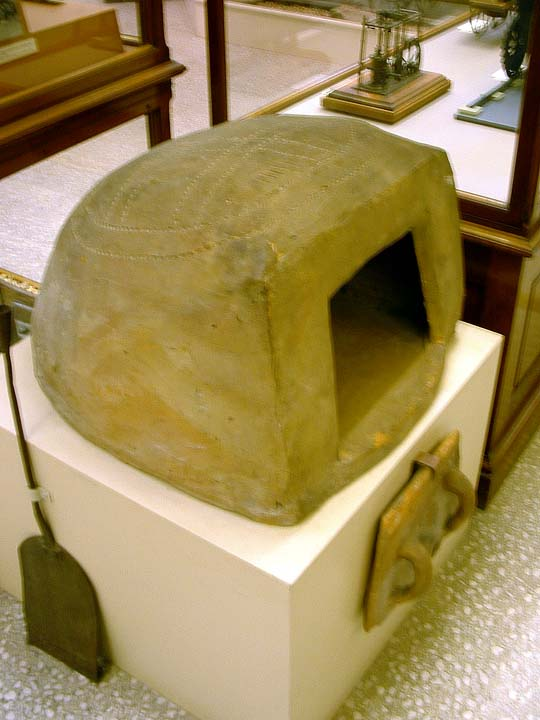
Clome oven in the Royal Cornwall Museum, Truro

A clome oven (or cloam oven) is a type of masonry oven with a removable door made of clay or cast iron. It was a standard fitting for most kitchen fireplaces in Cornwall and Devon. The oven would be built into the side of the chimney breast, often appearing as a round bulge in the chimney. This bulge was the masonry surrounding the oven, and was intended to be dismantled should the oven ever need to be replaced. During installation, they are surrounded by packed clay to prevent the actual oven cracking.

To use a clome oven, one must enter the fireplace and build a fire within the oven. Dried gorse or blackthorn was traditionally used. As the oven has no internal chimney, the smoke is allowed to escape through the oven door, and into the adjacent fireplace where it leaves through the main chimney. Once the oven is white hot, the hot ashes are either raked out or pushed aside, then the item to be baked is put in, and the door propped up to the opening.

As cast-iron range cookers were brought into common use, it became standard practice to build a dividing wall to split the fireplace into two separate fireplaces, thus allowing access to the clome oven, as well as providing a space of the correct dimensions to fit a Cornish range or similar. Bricks were the most common building material for this task, since the installation of a Cornish range required a brick flue to be built up the back of the fireplace. Many clome ovens were preserved in situ in this way.

== See also ==
- Horno
