= Fish pie =

Pie with the main ingredient being fish

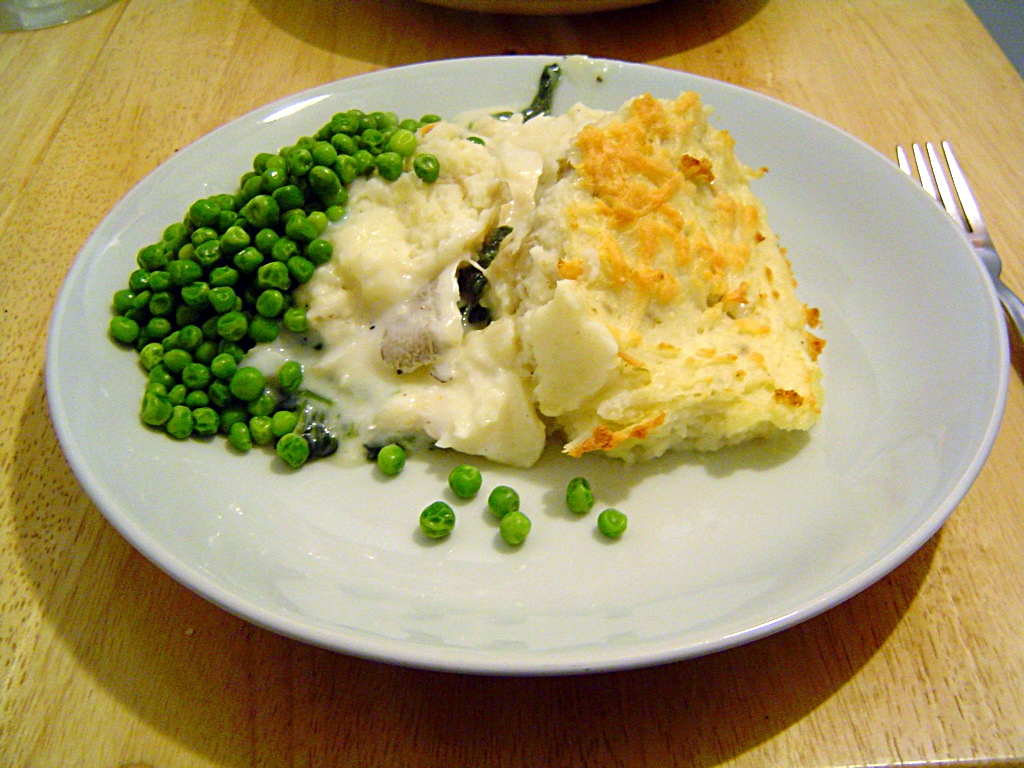
- Type: Savoury pie
- Place of origin: Britain
- Main ingredients: White fish, bechamel sauce,
- Variations: prawns, hard-boiled eggs, cheese

Fish pie, also known as fisherman's pie, is a traditional British dish. The dish is also popular in Australia and New Zealand. A turnover called a fish pie is made in Trinidad and Tobago.

== Origins ==
According to Cook's Illustrated, the dish was likely created to make use of fish scraps during Lent. John Murrell's 1615 A New Booke of Cookerie contained recipes for eel and carp pies that called for scraps. Jessup Whitehead's 1889 The Steward’s Handbook and Guide to Party Catering instructs the cook to poach the fish, then drain it and cover it in cream before baking.

== Ingredients ==
The pie is usually made with fresh and smoked fish (for example, cod, haddock, salmon) or seafood in a Béchamel sauce or cheddar cheese sauce made using the milk the fish was poached in. Hard-boiled eggs are a common additional ingredient. Parsley or chives are sometimes added to the sauce. It is mostly topped with mashed potatoes, (sometimes with cheese or vegetables such as onions and leeks added) however there are variations with a pastry top. The dish is sometimes referred to as "fisherman's pie" because the mashed potato topping is similar to that used for shepherd's pie.

== Royal fish pie ==
Gifts of fish pie to the king were a common tradition for various occasions. In a Lenten tradition, the town of Great Yarmouth was required to bake 100 herrings into two dozen pies and send them to the king. The prior of Llanthony, Gloucester, baked eels and carp into a pie as a gift to Henry VIII in 1530. In 1752, one was sent to the Prince of Wales. The tradition was also recorded during the reign of Queen Victoria.

== See also ==
- Stargazy pie
- Shepherd's pie, an unrelated meat-based dish which also uses potato instead of pastry
- List of pies, tarts and flans
