= Cornish fairing =

British ginger biscuit

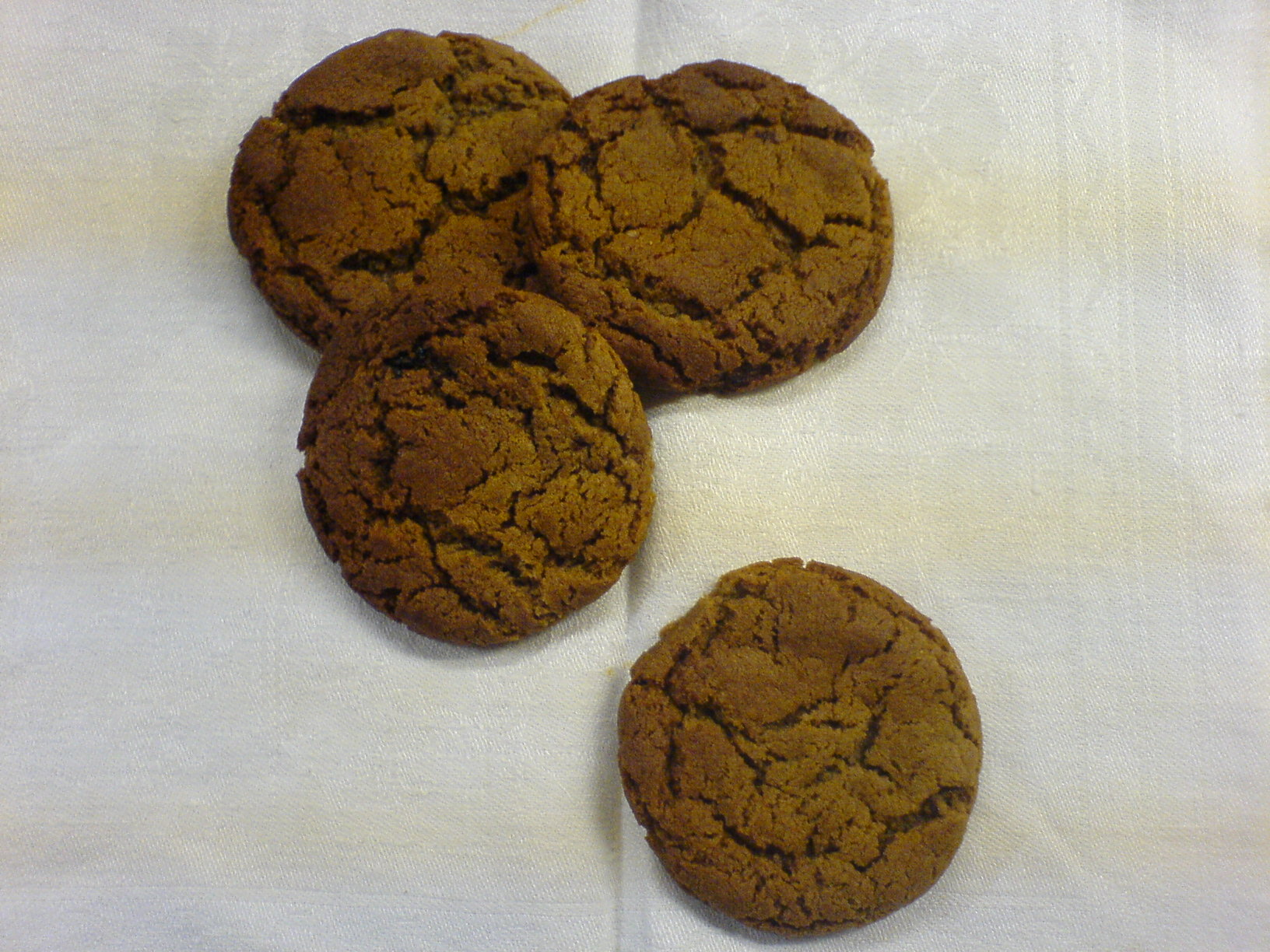
- Traditional Cornish fairings
- Course: Snack
- Place of origin: United Kingdom
- Region or state: Cornwall
- Main ingredients: Ginger, mixed spice, golden syrup
- Variations: Multiple

A Cornish fairing is a type of traditional ginger biscuit commonly found in Cornwall, England, United Kingdom. "Fairing" was originally a term for an edible treat sold at fairs around the country, though over time the name has become associated with ginger biscuits or gingerbread, which were given as a treat to children or by men to their sweethearts. In Cornwall, fairings contained ginger and became famous around the country when a Cornish manufacturer started selling them by mail order in 1886. The same manufacturer still makes them and the company has recently teamed up with celebrity chef Rick Stein to make biscuits.

== Description ==
Cornish fairings are sweet-and-spicy ginger biscuits, made with standard biscuit ingredients such as flour, caster sugar and butter, together with mixed spice, ginger, cinnamon, and golden syrup. They are roughly circular and brittle, similar to gingerbread. They are created by mixing the dry ingredients with butter, until the mixture resembles bread crumbs, then adding the sugar and syrup before forming the biscuits and baking high in the oven, followed by a period at the bottom of the oven.

== History ==
"Fairings" was originally the common name for edible souvenirs sold at fairs around England. Fairings would vary throughout the country: at Bartholomew Fair in Smithfield, fairings of gingerbread were sold from 1126 to 1800; in the northern counties, a traditional fairing would be a decorated "paste egg" at Easter. The Cornish version included the spiced ginger biscuit which became famous in Victorian times. The complete fairing from Cornwall would include the ginger biscuit, along with almond and caraway comfits (colloquially "lambs' tails" – actually sugar-coated almonds and caraway seeds), crystallised angelica and macaroons.

During the 1800s, the biscuits became a treat that young men from the middle or lower classes would buy as a treat for their sweetheart. Previously, the spices required to create the biscuits were exclusive to the wealthy classes, who used them to make cakes. A number of manufacturers started making ginger biscuits called "fairings" all over England. One example of this was in Grasmere, where the gingerbread sold as fairings was so popular that William Wordsworth's sister Dorothy wrote in one of her journals that she and her brother both craved them. In 1875, John Cooper Furniss obtained a large store in East Bridge Street, Truro, and premises on Duchy Wharf and installed ovens for biscuit manufacturing. He introduced several new kinds of biscuits and also a penny box of sweetmeats with every box containing a small piece of jewellery. Needless to say, these were very successful and in great demand. In 1886, John Cooper Furniss started selling the ginger biscuits at his tea room in Truro, Cornwall, baking them in his Truro bakery. They were so popular that he started selling them via mail-order. The recipe Furniss used is thought to have originated from a "maid-hiring" fair which used to take place during the week after Christmas, in Launceston, Cornwall although Furniss Foods suggest the recipe came from the fairs held at Whitsuntide or Corpus Christi.

Furniss went on to expand his company to Furniss Foods, a well-known Cornish biscuit manufacturer, which created a number of different fairing varieties, such as "orange and lemon" or "apple and cinnamon". He also established a Charitable Trust which is still in operation today. It is limited to the parish of Truro to provide assistance to residents in need who use coal as the primary source of heat. The company moved to a larger factory in 1988, but ran into financial difficulties during the 2000s and it was bought by Proper Cornish, a pasty manufacturer, which focused the company's production on the Cornish fairings and a couple of other lines.

Cornish foods are an essential element in the county's touristic appeal, with a survey by South West tourism showing food as one of the top three reasons people visit Cornwall. During an interview where he was launching a new line of biscuits, celebrity chef Rick Stein explained that he associated fairings with his childhood.

"When I was a child, we never left Cornwall without a couple of tins of Furniss Cornish Fairings. They were as important to us as clotted cream and pasties."

— Rick Stein
