= William Cornish =

William Cornish may refer to:

- William Cornish (legal scholar) (1937–2022), Australian legal scholar and academic
- William Robert Cornish (1828–1896), British physician
- William R. Cornish (1890–1969), member of the Legislative Assembly of Alberta
- William Cornysh, also spelt Cornish (1465–1523), English composer and dramatist
- Willie Cornish (1875–1942), American jazz musician
- William Crocker Cornish, co-founder of Cornish and Bruce, a railway contracting company in Victoria, Australia
