= Heavy cake =

Traditional cake from Cornwall

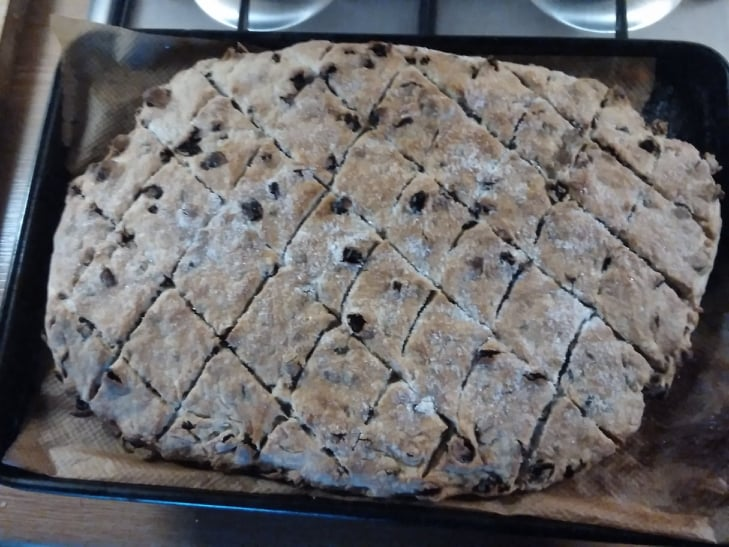
- Alternative names: Hevva cake
- Type: Cake
- Course: Dessert
- Place of origin: United Kingdom
- Region or state: Cornwall
- Main ingredients: Flour, lard, butter, milk, sugar, raisins

Heavy cake or Hevva cake (Cornish: Hevva) is a cake, made from flour, lard, butter, milk, sugar and raisins, that originated in Cornwall.

== History ==
Its name is derived from the pilchard (silver sardines) industry in Cornwall prior to the 20th century when a 'huer' (cliff top lookout) helped locate shoals of fish. In the 17th and 18th centuries, the huer would shout 'Hevva!, Hevva!' to alert the boats to the location of the pilchard shoals. Cornish tradition states that Hevva cake was baked by the huers on their return to their homes, the cake being ready by the time the crews returned to land. Heva became hevva and later morphed into the anglicized version heavy. The texture of the cake itself is neither heavy nor spongy.

== Flavour and appearance ==
With no raising agent or egg, they are simply made from flour, lard (or more recently butter), currants, milk, salt, ginger, and cinnamon. They may also have fruit incorporated into them. The cakes have a unique texture, which some describe as a cross between a cake and a shortbread, and a distinct appearance. The bake falls somewhere between a sweet scone and a light egg-free fruit cake. The cake's flavour is not dissimilar to the more familiar Welsh cakes (which, unlike hevva cakes, contain egg).

The cakes are about 1/2" thick, with a criss-cross pattern scored across the top, representing the fishing nets.

== See also ==
- Welsh cake
- List of cakes
