= Bob Corish =

English footballer

Personal information
- Full name: Robert Corish
- Date of birth: 13 September 1958 (age 68)
- Place of birth: Liverpool, England
- Position: Full back

Senior career*
Years	Team	Apps	(Gls)
1977–1978	Derby County	1	(0)
1979–1980	Fort Lauderdale Strikers	14	(0)
Total		15	(0)
- * Club domestic league appearances and goals

Robert Corish (born 13 September 1958), also known as Bobby Corish, is an English former professional footballer who played as a full back. Born in Liverpool, he played in the Football League for Derby County and in the North American Soccer League for the Fort Lauderdale Strikers.

After a knee injury ended his football career, he became a physician.
