= Gurty pudding =

Type of haggis from Cornwall

Gurty pudding is a type of haggis from Cornwall made from boiled pigs’ offal including lungs and spleen, minced with the scallops from the fat and with groats, boiled in the cooking liquor from the offal, seasoned, packed into large casings, tied and boiled.
