= Harry Cornish =

English cricketer

Personal information
- Full name: Harry Hemming Cornish
- Born: 19 February 1871; St James's Park, London, England
- Died: 24 October 1918 (aged 47); Bala, Pennsylvania, United States

Domestic team information
- Years: Team
- 1893: Middlesex

Career statistics
Competition	First-class
Matches	1
Runs scored	7
Batting average	3.50
100s/50s	–/–
Top score	6
Balls bowled	25
Wickets	–
Bowling average	–
5 wickets in innings	–
10 wickets in match	–
Best bowling	–
Catches/stumpings	–/–
- Source: Cricinfo, 30 June 2011

Harry Hemming Cornish (19 February 1871 – 24 October 1918) was an English cricketer. Cornish's batting and bowling styles are unknown. The son of James Cornish and Fanny Hemming, he was born in St James's Park, London.

Cornish made a single first-class appearance for Middlesex in 1893 against the touring Australians. In the Australians first-innings, he bowled 3 wicket-less overs. In Middlesex first-innings, he scored a single run before being dismissed by Hugh Trumble. In the Australians second-innings, he bowled 2 further wicket-less overs, while in the Middlesex second-innings, he scored 6 runs before being dismissed by George Giffen.

Two years later he married Florence Gwatkin, before later emigrating to the United States. His marriage to Florence must have ended in divorce, because 5 years later he married a woman called Dorethy in the United States. They had one son, Richard V. C. Cornish. While in America, he played cricket for Belmont Cricket Club, and in 1909 he played for the United States cricket team against Canada. He died in Bala, Pennsylvania on 24 October 1918.
