= Trevarrian =

Hamlet in Cornwall, UK

Coordinates: 50°27′25″N 5°01′44″W

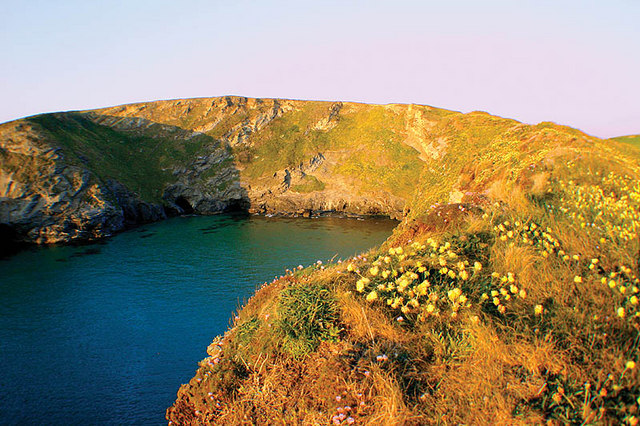
Beacon Cove

Trevarrian pronounced (Tre-Varrion) is a hamlet south of Mawgan Porth, Cornwall, England, United Kingdom.

== Cheese ==
St. Endellion is a brie style cheese, made at Trevarrian, cream enriched and hand-made using only Cornish milk and cream. The cheese is made by Cornish Country Larder, a firm founded by John Gaylard in the mid-1990s and still a family run concern. The cheese, which is named after St Endellion in north Cornwall, has won many notable awards.

== Cornish wrestling ==
Cornish wrestling tournaments have been held at Trevarrian in various venues, including the field opposite the Travellers' Rest Hotel.
