= Cornish Brie =

Type of British cheese from Cornwall, England

Cornish Brie is a type of brie-style, soft, white-rinded British cheese from Cornwall, England. Cornish brie is made by several dairies and has won a number of awards.

Makers have included the Cornish Cheese Company, Cornish Country Larder and Cornish Cuisine. Cornish Country Larder's Cornish Brie won first prize in the organic class at the Nantwich International Cheese Show in 2003 and gold medal at the British Cheese awards 2002.

Cornish Country Larder also make an added-cream version, called St. Endellion.
