= Richard Cornish (shipmaster) =

English ship captain

Richard Cornish, also known as Richard Williams, was an English ship captain. He is known for being accused of raping 19-year-old indentured servant William Couse. Executed in the Colony of Virginia in 1625 he is reported to have been one of the earliest people, if not the first person, to have been hanged for sodomy in what would eventually become the United States.

== Rape accusations ==
In 1624 Cornish was ship master of the Ambrose, which was harbored in the James River of August of that year. During this time Couse worked on the Ambrose and was ordered to put clean sheets on Cornish's bed, upon which point Couse alleged that his master had been drunk and made a sexual advance upon him. Despite Couse's refusal, Cornish was then reported to have forcibly sodomized Couse. He also reported that Cornish also later sexually fondled him on numerous occasions and also humiliated him in front of the rest of the crew.

== Trial ==
Couse left the ship and deposed to the governor and other members of the council of the colony of Virginia that Cornish had forcibly sodomized him. Walter Mathew, the boatswain's mate on ship, attested to his accusations. Cornish was convicted of sodomy, sentenced to death, and executed by hanging in 1625.

Several mariners and Virginia residents later asserted that Cornish, an excellent mariner, had been unjustly hanged, and they blamed the governor, Sir Francis Wyatt.

== Legacy ==
In 1993 the William and Mary Gay and Lesbian Alumni created the Richard Cornish Endowment Fund for Gay and Lesbian Resources.
