= King Byerd =

Apple cultivar

'King Byerd'
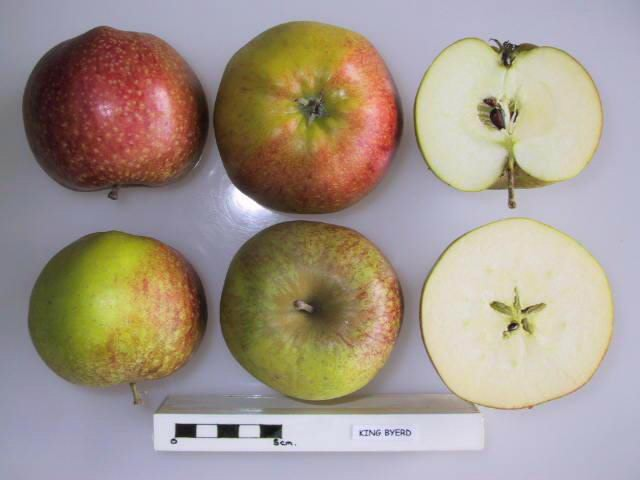
- Species: Malus domestica
- Cultivar: 'King Byerd'
- Origin: Cornwall

The King Byerd (or King Bayard) is a cultivar of domesticated apple, that originated in Cornwall. It is primarily used for cooking.

The fruit has green skin, which turns yellow when ripened, developing flecks of red and grey russet. It is harvested from late October, primarily in South-East England. It has a sharp, sweet taste, resulting in its mostly being recommended for cooking meals and desserts. It is considered at its best from January to March, when it mellows to have a sweet, sharp taste. The primary disease affecting the King Byerd cultivar is apple scab.
