= Cornish Blue =

British cheese

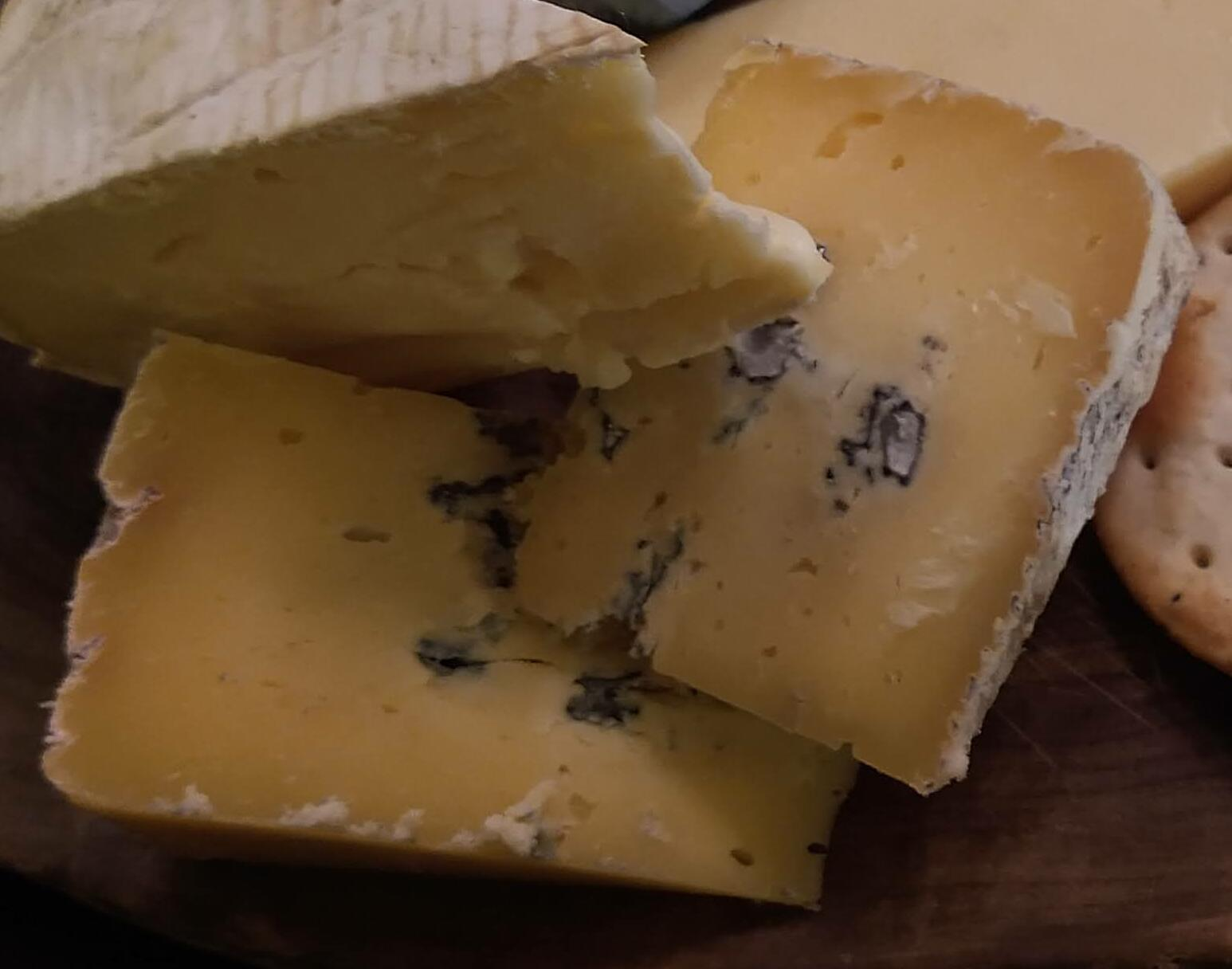
- Country of origin: United Kingdom
- Source of milk: cow's milk

Cornish Blue is a type of blue cheese from Cornwall, England, United Kingdom. It is made by the Cornish Cheese Company at Upton Cross.

It has won Gold in the British Cheese Awards 2004, Best Blue & Best English Cheese 2007, Royal Bath & West Supreme Champion Cheese 2010, and was recognised in December 2010 as the winning cheese in the World Cheese Awards ahead of 2600 other entries from 26 countries.

== See also ==
- List of Cornish cheeses
- List of British cheeses
- List of cheeses
