= Mary Cornish =

New Zealand performing arts educator

Mary Cornish MNZM
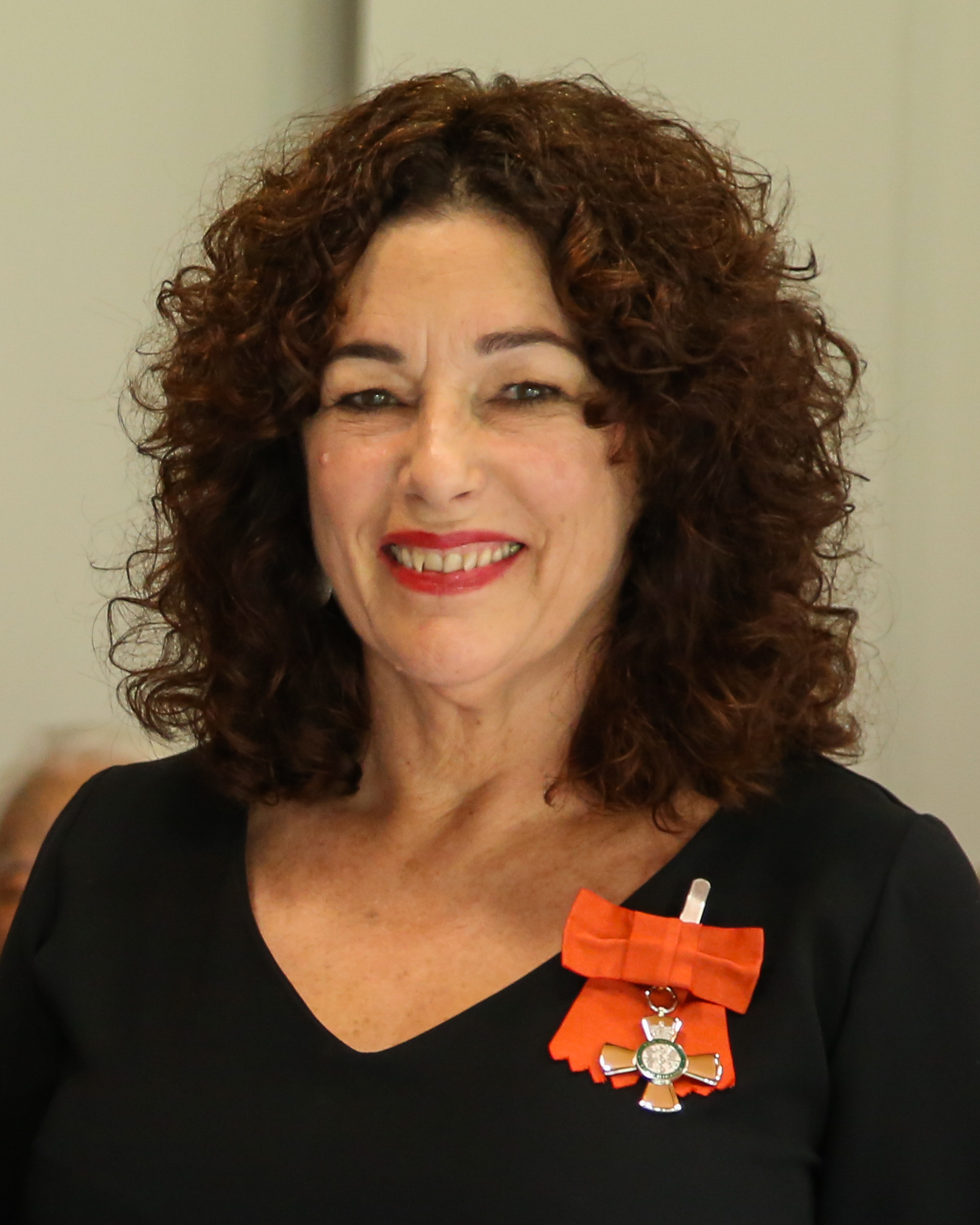
- Cornish in 2023
- Awards: Member of the New Zealand Order of Merit

Catherine Mary Cornish MNZM is a New Zealand music educator, artistic director and choral conductor. In 2023 Cornish was appointed a Member of the New Zealand Order of Merit for services to the performing arts.

== Career ==
Cornish is a music teacher and has taught at primary, intermediate and secondary levels. Cornish was a founding trustee and chair of the New Zealand Ukulele Trust for six years, from 2010 to 2016. The trust organises the annual Ukulele Festival, which celebrated its tenth birthday in 2016, when it involved 2000 players from 122 schools across New Zealand. Cornish was the artistic director of the festival, and arranged for guest artists including Dave Dobbyn and Six60 to play alongside the schoolchildren.

Cornish founded a bi-annual festival, In Our Beat, in 2010. She is the artistic director and conductor for the festival, which connects schools and communities. She is also the choral director of the Auckland Primary Musical Festival, an annual festival, and has conducted choirs at the Kids Sing event. She leads choirs at St Cuthbert's College in Auckland.

Cornish co-authored the New Zealand Ukulele Handbook for Teachers, with Maria Winder, and the Kiwileles Songbooks series. Cornish is a mentor in the New Zealand Choral Foundation mentorship programme Singing Matters. She has also written two editions of the NZ Choral Foundation's Hear Our Voices.

== Honours and awards ==
In the 2023 New Year Honours Cornish was appointed a Member of the New Zealand Order of Merit for services to the performing arts.
