= Caerphilly cheese =

Welsh cheese

Caerphilly
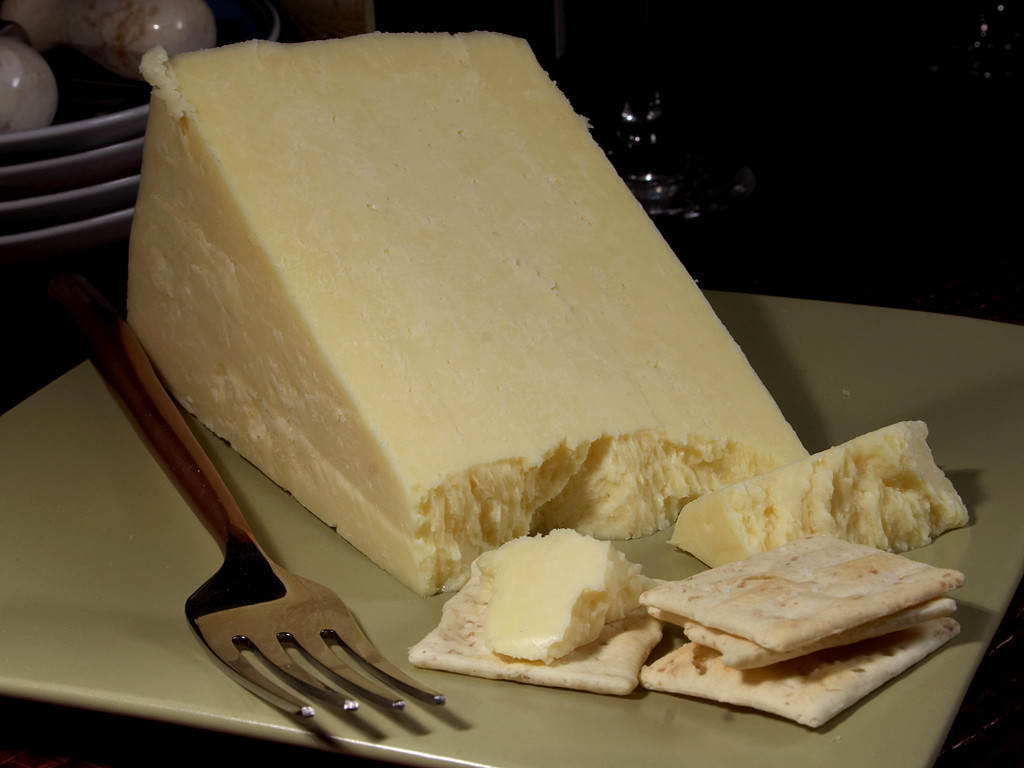
- Country of origin: Wales
- Region: Mid Glamorgan
- Town: Caerphilly
- Source of milk: Cows
- Pasteurised: Frequently
- Texture: Hard
- Aging time: Up to ten weeks
- Named after: Caerphilly

Caerphilly is a hard, crumbly white cheese that originated in the area around the town of Caerphilly, Wales. It is thought to have been created to provide food for the local coal miners. The Caerphilly of that period had a greater moisture content, and was made in local farms. At the start of the 20th century, competition for milk in the local area saw production decline, and Caerphilly production was gradually relocated to England.

During the Second World War, production was stopped and diverted to Cheddar in English factories. After the war, those factories began to produce Caerphilly as it was quicker to make than Cheddar, and therefore more profitable. The majority of Caerphilly is now produced in Somerset and Wiltshire. Artisan cheesemakers still make Caerphilly in the pre-war style, and these have been successful at the British Cheese Awards.

== History ==
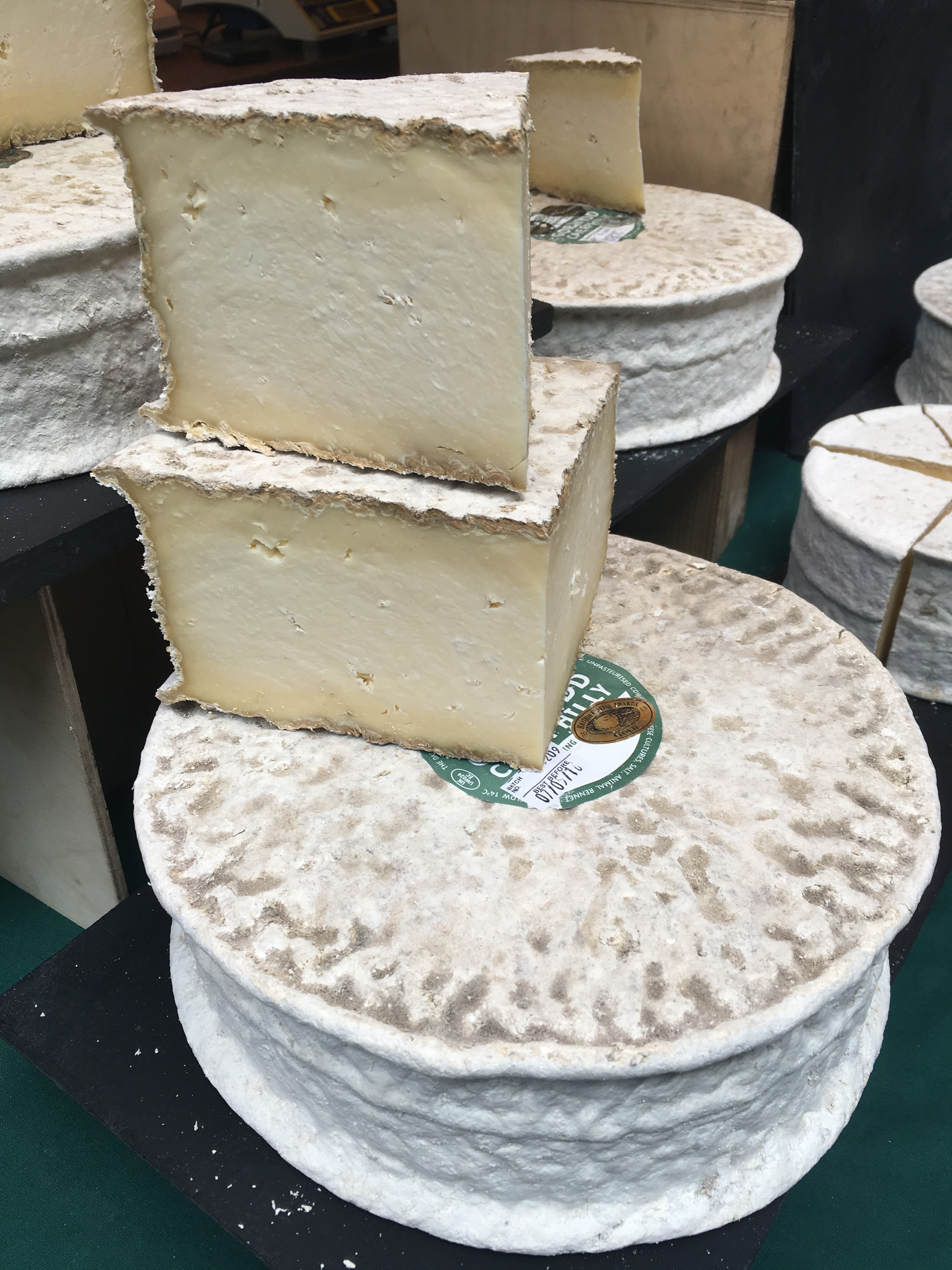
Wheels of unpasteurised Caerphilly cheese

Caerphilly cheese was originally a moist curd, made in local farms. It has since been replaced with a much drier version produced on an industrial scale. However, there still remain some cheesemakers producing Caerphilly in the old style on an artisan basis. The cheese was originally made to feed the coal miners of the area. It has subsequently been suggested that the salt content of the cheese was required by manual workers, and it can be cut into wedges and does not dry out in the conditions underground. Caerphilly became a centre for cheese production, but over time competing demands for the milk required resulted in production of the cheese moving to England at the start of the 20th century.

Farmhouse Caerphilly production died out during World War II as it did not keep as well as Cheddar from English factories for the war effort. After the war those factories started making their own versions of Caerphilly, which matured very quickly and thus required less financing. Over time, the public forgot the difference between the old and new Caerphilly cheeses.

The majority of mass-produced Caerphilly cheese is now produced in the English counties of Somerset and Wiltshire. There was a resurgence in farmhouse-produced Caerphilly during the 1980s in Wales, as a result of the work of Cenarth Cheese. This originated because milk quotas imposed at the time meant that milk was being thrown away and so Thelma Adams decided to make a business out of producing cheese from the excess milk.

By the late 1990s, there were no cheesemakers in Caerphilly making the cheese for which the town is known. Realising this, Castle Dairies began making the cheese shortly after they opened in the town. Rather than using factory methods, they use the pre-war production techniques by hand. They won a gold and a bronze award at the British Cheese Awards in 2000. Caerphilly cheese was one of nine Welsh products considered by the British Government in July 2015 as candidates for name protection under the Geographical indications and traditional specialities in the European Union rules. It was the only cheese considered as a candidate on the list.

During the mid-19th century the town of Caerphilly became renowned less as a place of manufacture than for its weekly cheese market, where cheese made on farms across South Wales was brought to be sold. A grading system was introduced by Edward Lewis, caretaker of the town's Market Hall, who acted as the official cheese-tester; cheese judged to be of good quality was stamped with a circular mark reading "Caws Cymru" (Welsh cheese), "Caws Pur" (pure cheese) and "Genuine Caerphilly Cheese", bearing a central image of Caerphilly Castle. The practice was discontinued after Lewis's death in 1909.

== Description ==
Caerphilly is a light-coloured (almost white) crumbly cheese made from cow's milk, and generally has a fat content of between 45% and 55%. It has a mild taste, with a tang of lemon. A traditional Caerphilly must be made with milk produced by Welsh farms. It can be either pasteurised or unpasteurised, and comes in both organic and non-organic varieties.

It is created by adding rennet to buttermilk, resulting in curd production. This is then formed and cut, before being pressed lightly into a cylindrical mould. These rounds are then submerged in a bath of brine for 24 hours to cause the production of a rind. Rice flour is used to dust the outside of the cheese, resulting in a white colour for the rind. The cheese ripens quickly, in as little as two weeks. The acid production of the cheese is initially slow, but builds up. This and the low temperature used during production mean that the acid naturally dries out the curd, causing the crumbly texture. The cheese is nicknamed "The Crumblies".

== Protected status ==
Traditional Welsh Caerphilly and Traditional Welsh Caerffili are both protected by European Protected Geographical Indication (PGI) status.

== Reception and legacy ==
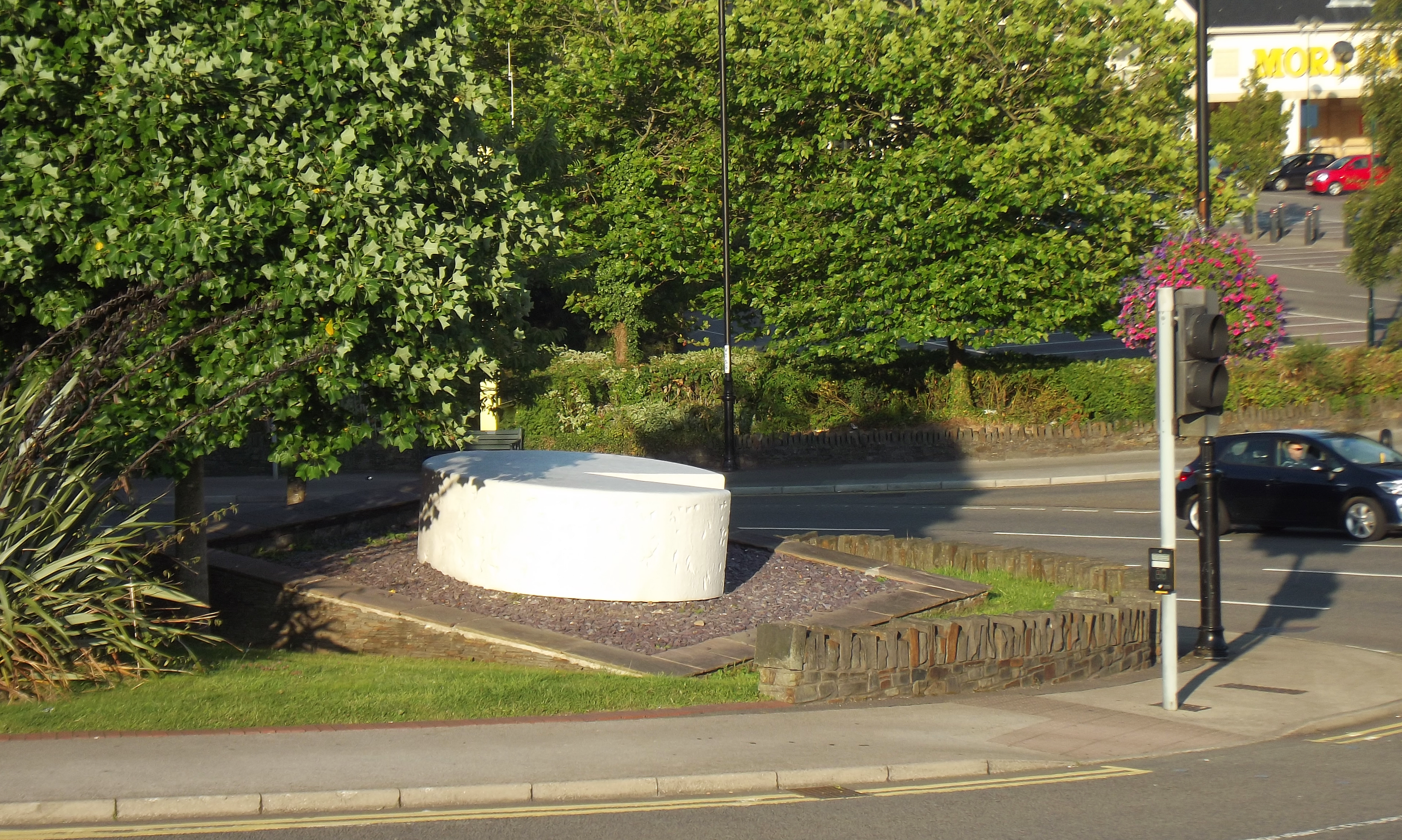
A sculpture dedicated to Caerphilly cheese

An article in the Chicago Sun-Times in 1987 extolled the virtues of Caerphilly cheese. It described it as having a "mild, salty, buttermilk" flavour and being halfway between ricotta and cheddar.

Bee Wilson, writing for The Daily Telegraph on 9 October 2011, praised the old style of Caerphilly now made by small-scale producers such as Gorwydd Farm. She compared it with French cheeses, calling it "buttery" in comparison to the post-war mass manufactured type which she called "young and flavourless, with the texture of chalk".

The town of Caerphilly holds an annual three-day festival to celebrate the cheese, entitled The Big Cheese (Welsh: Y Caws Mawr). Also in Caerphilly is a sculpture of a cheese. A best Caerphilly cheese category forms part of the annual British Cheese Awards. In 2004, Gorwydd Caerphilly won both the Caerphilly prize and the overall award for best Traditional British cheese. It was made by brothers Todd and Maugan Trethowan at their family farm in Tregaron, Ceredigion. However, they failed to win the Best Welsh Cheese category.

== See also ==
- List of cheeses
- List of British cheeses
- Yarg a similar style of cheese from Cornwall
