= Keltic Gold =

Semi-hard cheese from Cornwall, UK

Keltic Gold is a type of semi-hard cheese from Cornwall in the United Kingdom. It is made by Whalesborough Farm Foods near Bude.

During ripening, it is dipped in cider and scrubbed three times each week. The milk comes from Trewithen Dairy and the cider from Cornish Orchards. The cheese has been supplied to Fortnum & Mason and Arsenal football club and the House of Commons.

== Awards ==
- Super Gold - World Cheese Awards 2012
- Gold - British Cheese Awards 2011 and 2012
- Two Star Gold - Great Taste Awards 2011
- Gold - Speciality Cheese Nantwich International Cheese Show 2011
- Silver - British Cheese Awards 2013
- 2 Star Gold - Great Taste Awards 2013
