= Cornish Aromatic =

Apple cultivar

Malus domestica Borkh 'Cornish Aromatic'
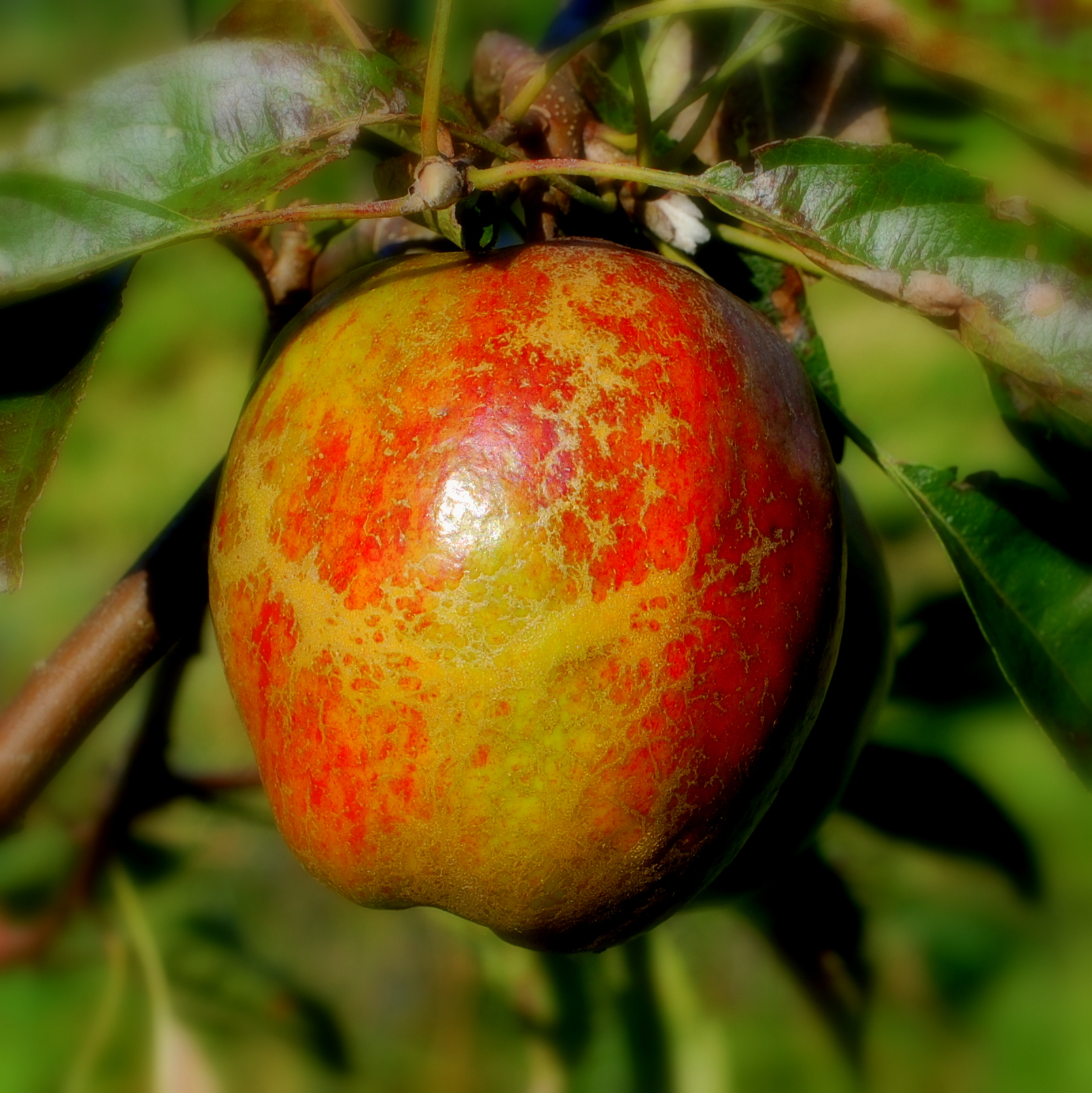
- Cultivar: 'Cornish Aromatic'
- Origin: introduced 1813

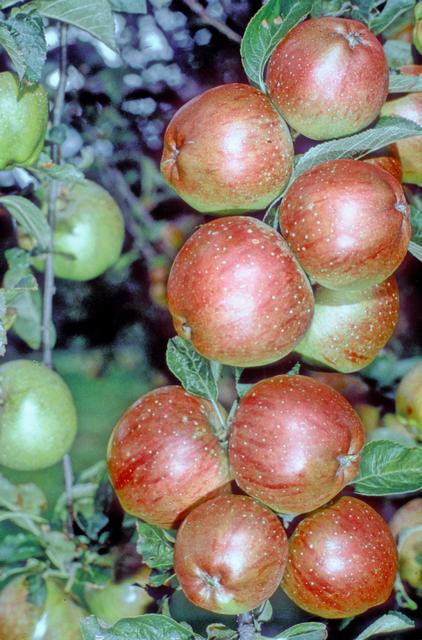
Cornish Aromatic apples on a tree

Cornish Aromatic is an apple cultivar with a crisp, nut-like aromatic flavour that was first recorded in Cornwall in 1813.

== Characteristics ==
According to the biologist Robert Hogg in his work "British Pomology"

High-quality dessert apple.

- History: Found growing in Cornwall, England. Brought to notice in 1813.
- Shape: Fruit, above medium size, 77mm wide, and 69mm high; roundish, angular, slightly flattened, and narrowing towards the eye. Skin, yellow on the shaded side, and covered with large patches of pale brown russet, which extend all over the base, and sprinkled with green and russety dots; but of a beautiful bright red, which is streaked with deeper red, and strewed with patches and dots of russet on the side exposed to the sun. Eye small and closed, with long flat segments, which are reflexed at the tips and set in an irregular basin. Stalk short, inserted in a deep and narrow cavity which is lined with russet.
- Flesh yellowish, firm, crisp, juicy, rich, and highly aromatic. A valuable dessert apple of first-rate quality.
- Picking: mid October.
- Use October-March.
- Tree is a free grower and an excellent bearer.
