= Cornish Yarg =

Cornish semi-hard cheese

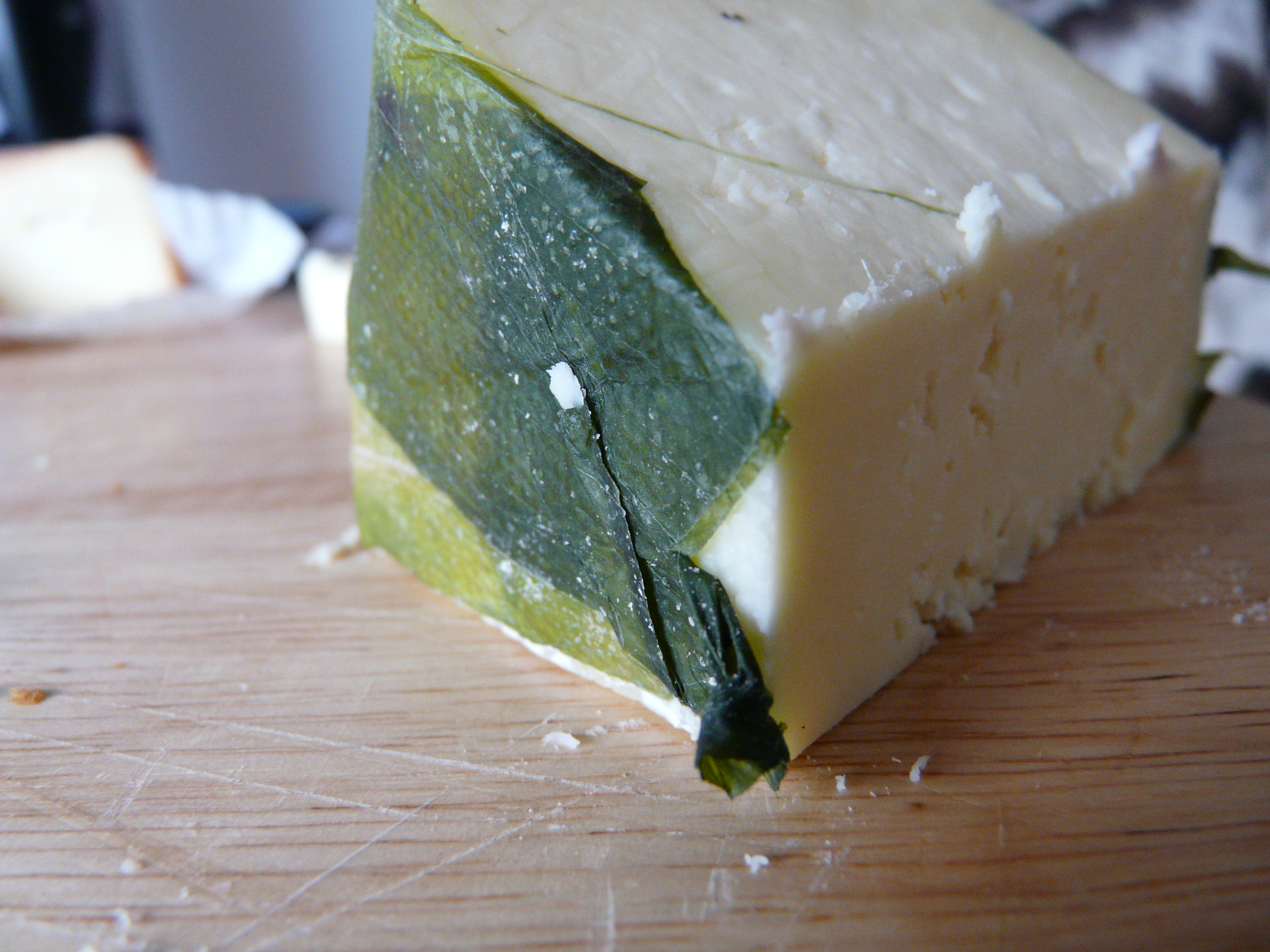
- Country of origin: England
- Region: Cornwall
- Town: Truro
- Source of milk: Cows
- Pasteurised: Yes
- Texture: Semi-hard; creamy under rind, crumbly in center
- Named after: Gray

Cornish Yarg is a semi-hard cow's milk cheese made in Cornwall, England. Before being left to mature, the cheese is wrapped in nettle leaves to form an edible, though mouldy, rind. The texture varies from creamy and soft immediately under the nettle coating to a Caerphilly cheese-like crumbly texture in the middle.

== Production ==
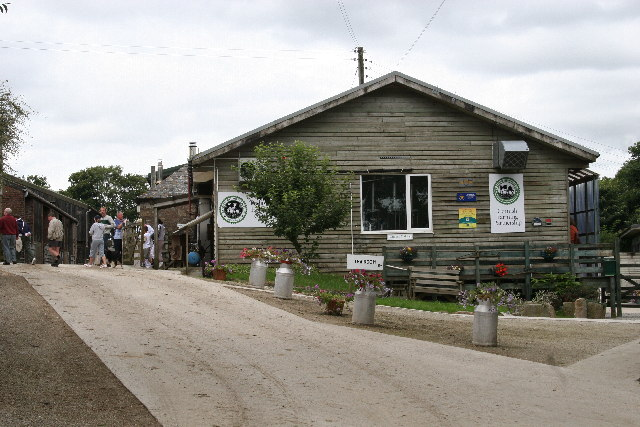
Lynher Dairies

Although made according to an historic method, Cornish Yarg is actually the product of the British cheesemaking renaissance in the 1980s while its roots are inspired by traditional British territorial cheeses.

The cheese is produced at Lynher Dairies Cheese Company on Pengreep Farm, Ponsanooth, near Truro, by Catherine Mead, Dane Hopkins and team. "Yarg" is simply "Gray" spelt backwards. It is named after Alan and Jenny Gray, farmers who found a 1615 recipe by Gervase Markham for a nettle-wrapped semi-hard cheese in their attic. The original recipe is thought to date back to the 13th century.

In 1984, the Grays sold the recipe to Michael and Margaret Horrell, farmers wanting to diversify into cheesemaking. Mead began working with the Horrells in 1985, helping to develop the business. She built a second dairy on Pengreep Farm in 2001 and in 2006, when the Horrells retired, all production moved to Lynher Dairies.

Cornish Yarg is made using pasteurised cow's milk sourced from neighbouring farms. After pressing and brining, nettles are coated on by hand. The application of nettles changes the acidity on the outside of the cheese, thus affecting the manner in which the curd breaks down and matures.
