= List of United Kingdom food and drink products with protected status =

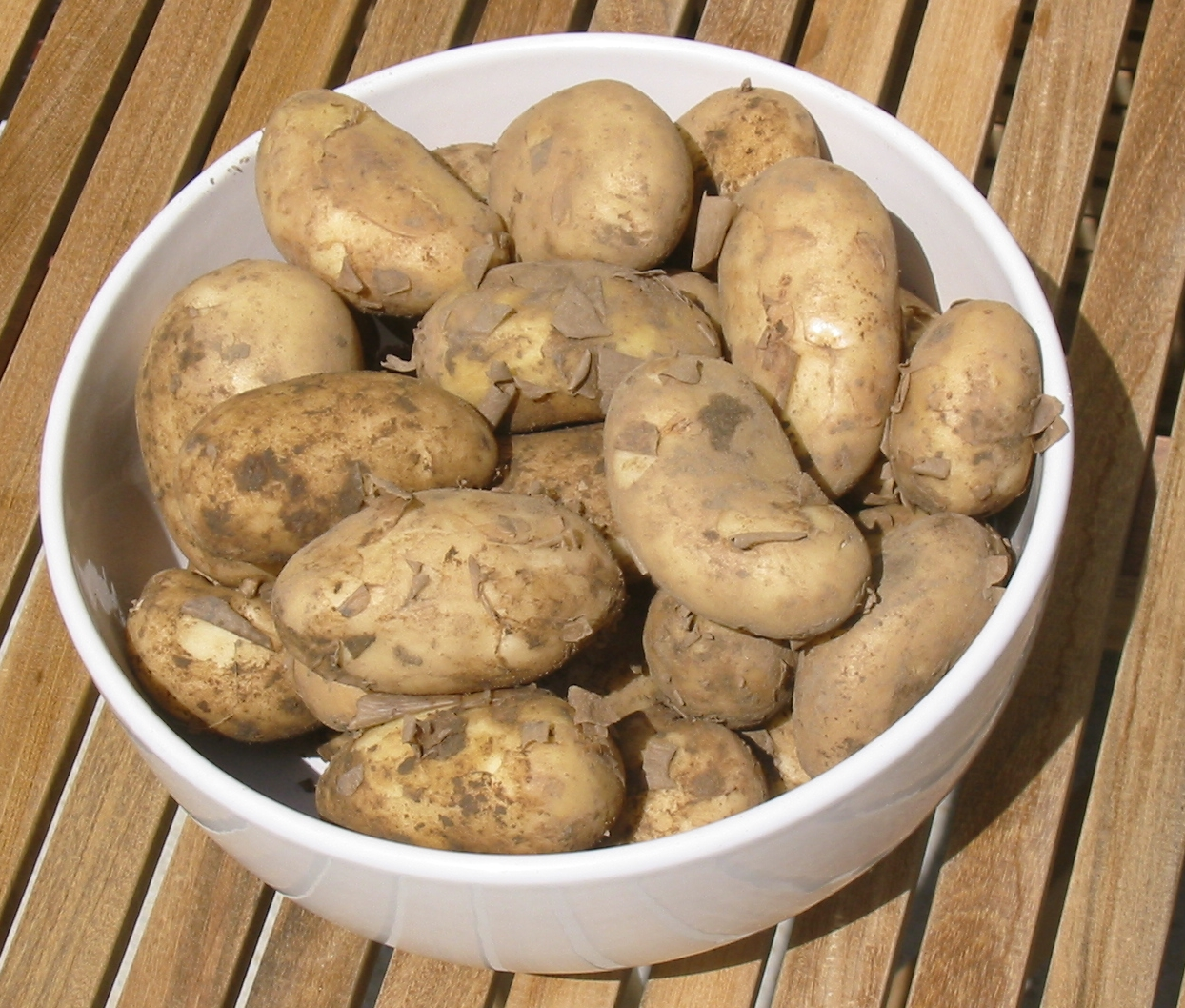
Jersey Royal potatoes were one of the first product names indicating the UK or the Crown dependencies to receive protected status, after it was registered as a PDO in 1996.

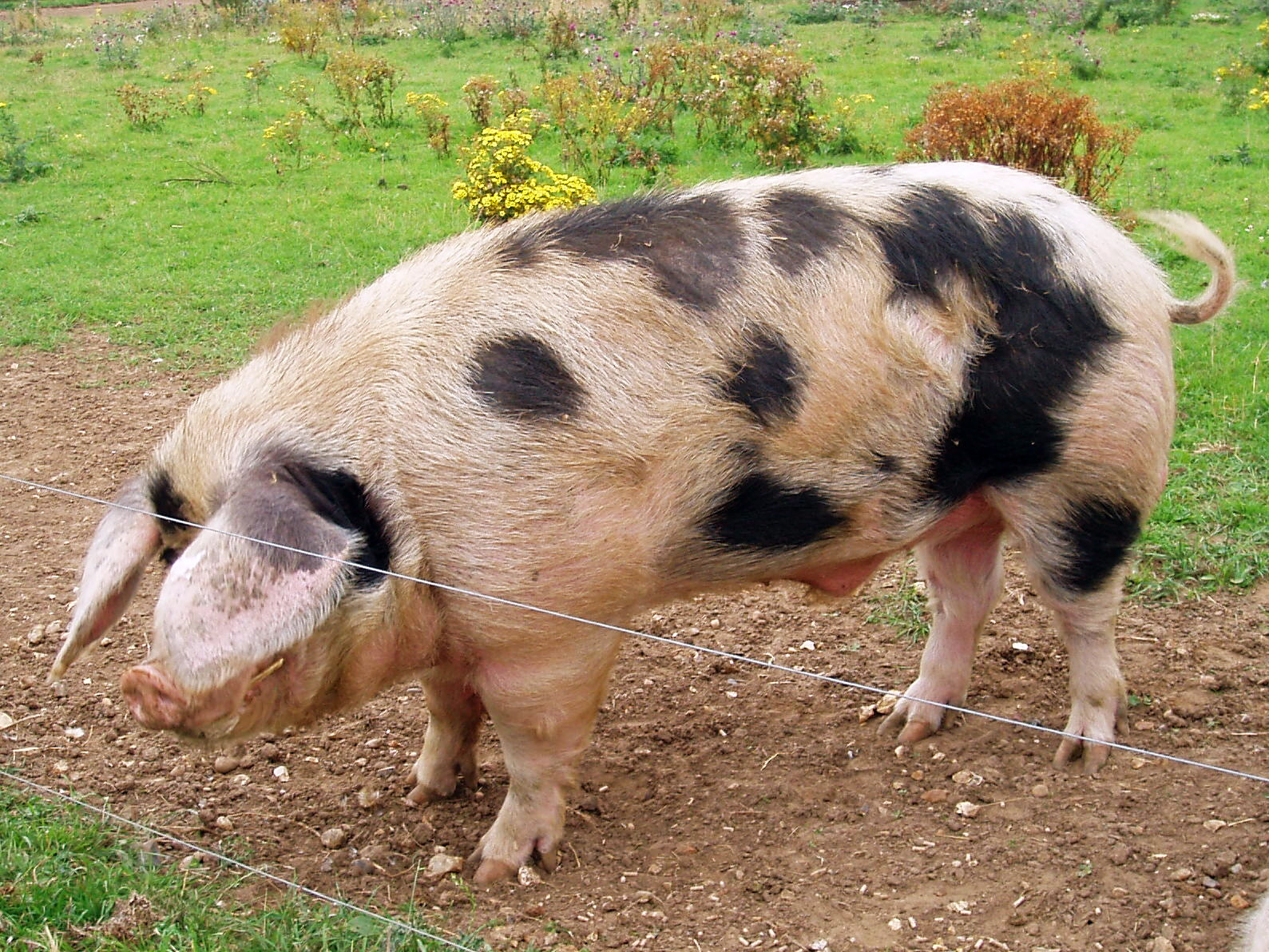
Meat from the Gloucester Old Spot (under the name 'Traditionally farmed Gloucestershire Old Spots pork') is one of four UK products holding TSG status

A number of United Kingdom food and drink products have been granted protected geographical status under UK law and European Union law. Protection of geographical indications is granted to names that indicate geographical origin both inside and outside the United Kingdom. A number of geographical indications for food and drink products originating in the Crown dependencies, which are not part of the UK, are also protected under the British law. These are also listed in this article.

The stated purpose of the quality schemes is to protect the reputation of regional products, promote traditional and agricultural activity and to eliminate non-genuine products, which may mislead consumers or be of inferior or different character; for example, producers cannot refer to their product as Scotch whisky unless it has been produced within Scotland, following particular methods. The quality schemes include two types of geographical indicators: "protected designation of origin" (PDO) (which are appellations of origin) and "protected geographical indication" (PGI) (which are geographical indications). These two types of designations are available for food, agricultural products and wines. For spirit drinks and aromatised wine, the equivalent designation to a PGI is called a "geographical indication" (GI). In addition, the quality schemes also include "traditional specialities guaranteed" (TSG), which are designed to promote and protect names of quality agricultural products and foodstuffs without requiring any reference to geographical origin.

The United Kingdom and the Crown dependencies together have a total of 94 products with protected status. This is relatively few when compared with Portugal (195 protected status products), France (758) and Italy (882). However, the UK and Crown dependencies have considerably more designations than many other countries, including Ireland (11), Sweden (18) or (for example) the United States, Japan or Korea (none). Most of the products hold either PGI (51 in the UK and 49 in the EU) or PDO (32 in the UK, 31 in the EU) status, with 4 products being designated as TSG.

This list, is compiled according to the eAmbrosia European Commission database and the UK 'Protected geographical food and drink names' database. They list all registered products, as well as all products which were formerly registered or for which registration has been applied.

== Legislation ==
=== Introduction as EU member state (applicable in the UK until 2021) ===
The schemes were introduced by the European Union, while the United Kingdom was a member, in 1993. From 2012 they were governed by Regulation (EU) No 1151/2012 of the European Parliament and of the Council, in part to overhaul and regulate the protected status system. Spirits, fortified wines and aromatised wines, described by the European Commission as "spirit drinks", were governed by a separate regulation, Regulation (EC) No 110/2008 of the European Parliament and of the Council.

The EU uses three different protected status schemes, which provide differing characteristics and levels and types of protection.

- Protected Designation of Origin (PDO): this designation covers products that are "produced, processed and prepared" in a specific area, using a particular, usually traditional, method.
- Protected Geographical Indication (PGI): this designation covers products whose "production, processing or preparation" takes places in a specific area.
- Traditional Speciality Guaranteed (TSG): this designation covers products with a "traditional character" or "customary names", distinguishing them from similar products. Unlike PDO and PGI, these products do not need to be connected to a specific area or method of production. In order to be considered for TSG status, a product must demonstrate that the materials and methods used in its production has been consistent for a minimum of 30 years.

=== Application under UK law (applicable in England, Scotland and Wales since 2021) ===
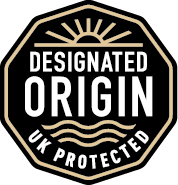
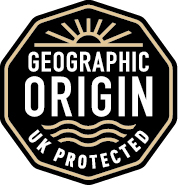
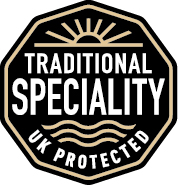
PDO, PGI and TSG logo applicable in England, Wales and Scotland

After the United Kingdom's withdrawal from the European Union and the transition period (which ended on 31 December 2020), the UK initiated a separate scheme governed by the same rules, which applies in England, Scotland and Wales.

The designations in effect on 31 December 2020 under the EU scheme (from any country), are since 2021 governed by UK law, which is an amended version of Regulation 1151/2021. Designations applied for under UK law since 1 January 2021, are not recognized in the EU, although an application for registration under EU law can still be made.

=== Application under EU law in the UK (applicable in Northern Ireland since 2021) ===
EU PDO, PGI and TSG logo (in English) applicable in Northern Ireland

As a result of the Protocol on Ireland/Northern Ireland of the Withdrawal agreement, Northern Ireland remains covered by the EU scheme, and not the UK scheme. This means that for existing indications on 31 December 2020 the same indications are applicable as in other parts of the UK. However, new designations under EU law are automatically protected in Northern Ireland, while that is not the case for new designations under UK law. Furthermore, in Northern Ireland manufacturers are required to print the EU logos for the indications, rather than the UK logos.

== Application process ==
Applications under the United Kingdom’s geographical indications (GI) scheme follow a defined sequence of stages. The applicant first completes a product specification. This document outlines the production methods, provides proof of origin, identifies the geographical location and the applicant’s connection to it, nominates a control body, and details the applicant’s entitlement to use any special product labels. Supporting evidence must then be produced.

The applicant next prepares a single document that summarises the product specification. If the application meets the scheme’s requirements, this summary is published on the UK Government website.

The published specification and single document are then open to objection by third parties for three months, with a further two months allowed for the submission of a reasoned statement of objection.

Where objections are received and accepted as valid, the applicant and the objecting parties have three months in which to reach agreement on the product specification and single document. Minor amendments may be made by consent; substantial changes require a fresh application.

If no agreement is reached, a competent authority issues a final decision on the application. Either the applicant or a third party may appeal an acceptance or rejection to the First-tier Tribunal.

== Products with protected status ==
The categorisation below is based on the format used in the Database of Origin and Registration and E-Bacchus databases. The year is the year of first registration in either the UK or EU.

In 5 cases the EU registered a name of 2 products under the same entry, whereas they were registered under separate entries in the UK. In that case the UK-naming convention is followed.

=== Fresh meat (and offal) ===
Product	Designation (System)	Year Awarded	Notes
Cambrian Mountains Lamb	PGI (UK) (Note: Applicable in England, Wales and Scotland)	2021	Limited to meat from lambs born, reared and slaughtered in the Cambrian Mountains area of mid Wales.
Gower Salt Marsh Lamb	PDO (UK, EU)	2021	A type of salt marsh lamb (Agneau de pré-salé) limited to sheep that are born reared and slaughtered on the Gower Peninsula. It is the unique vegetation and environment of the salt marshes on the north Gower coastline, where the lambs graze, which gives the meat its distinctive characteristics. Protection under EU law was first opposed by France and registered in 2023 following a voluntary change in the description indicating the lamb may be frozen prior to selling it.
Isle of Man Manx Loaghtan lamb	PDO (UK, EU) (Note: Applicable in the EU and Northern Ireland)	2008	Limited to products produced, processed and prepared on the Isle of Man, using traditional methods. Products should be produced from lambs grazed on unimproved land and if supplementary feed is needed this should be sourced from locally grown grain.
Lakeland Herdwick	PDO (UK, EU)	2013	Limited to products produced, processed and prepared in Cumbria. Products must be produced from sheep grazed locally and any supplementary feed should be sourced in Cumbria. Lakeland Herdwick lamb must be slaughtered between 8 and 12 months of age.
Orkney beef	PDO (UK, EU)	1996	Limited to products produced and reared on Orkney, using traditional methods. The cattle must be slaughtered and prepared on Orkney.
Orkney lamb	PDO (UK, EU)	1996	Limited to products produced and reared on Orkney, using traditional methods. The lambs must be slaughtered and prepared on Orkney.
Scotch beef	PGI (UK, EU)	2004	Limited to products produced in Scotland, including the Outer Hebrides, Shetland and Orkney. Products must be produced from cattle reared, slaughtered and dressed in Scotland.
Scotch lamb	PGI (UK, EU)	2004	Limited to products produced in Scotland, including the Outer Hebrides, Shetland and Orkney. Products must be produced from sheep reared, slaughtered and dressed in Scotland.
Shetland lamb	PDO (UK, EU)	1996	Limited to products produced, processed and prepared in Shetland, using traditional methods. Products must be produced from lambs no more than 12 months old at the time of slaughter.
Traditionally farmed Gloucestershire Old Spots pork	TSG (UK, EU)	2010	In order to be designated as such the product should be from Gloucestershire Old Spots, described as "traditional unimproved breeds". The animals should be reared using traditional farming methods, including allowing the meat to mature on the bone for several days. The Designation (System) refers to all products of the pig, including bacon, gammon, sausages etc.
Traditionally Reared Pedigree Welsh Pork	TSG (UK, EU)	2017	The product is meat from Pedigree Welsh pigs, which had a diet of "low in protein where the protein percentage of purchased feed does not exceed 20 % post weaning."
Welsh beef	PGI (UK, EU)	2002	Limited to products from cattle that are born and reared in Wales. Products must come from cattle that have not bred.
Welsh lamb	PGI (UK, EU)	2003	Limited to products that are produced from lambs born and reared in Wales.
West Country beef	PGI (UK, EU)	2014	Limited to products produced from cattle born, reared and processed in the West Country (Cornwall, Devon, Dorset, Gloucestershire, Somerset and Wiltshire). Products must have a diet of at least 70% forage.
West Country lamb	PGI (UK, EU)	2014	Limited to products that are produced from lambs born and reared in the West Country (Cornwall, Devon, Dorset, Gloucestershire, Somerset and Wiltshire). Products must be no more than 12 months old at the time of slaughter.

=== Meat products (cooked, salted, smoked, etc.) ===
Product	Designation (System)	Year Awarded	Notes
Carmarthen Ham	PGI (UK, EU)	2016	The ham is air-dried at 16–26 degrees for 6–9 months in the Carmarthen area.
Melton Mowbray pork pie	PGI (UK, EU)	2008	Limited to products produced using a traditional recipe and within the vicinity of Melton Mowbray.
New Forest Pannage Ham	PGI (UK)	2023	Limited to ham made from pigs which were released in New Forest in the year before they were slaughtered and where they eat acorns and beech mast. The ham is produced in Hampshire, Dorset or Wiltshire.
Newmarket sausage	PGI (UK, EU)	2012	Limited to products produced within the vicinity of Newmarket. Products must have a meat content of at least 70% and be made from prime cuts of meat from the belly or shoulder.
Stornoway black pudding	PGI (UK, EU)	2013	Limited to products produced using a traditional recipe with a prescribed ratio of ingredients and within the vicinity of Isle of Lewis and "the surrounding 'Stornoway Trust' area".
Traditional Cumberland sausage	PGI (UK, EU)	2011	Limited to products produced in Cumbria. Products must have a meat content of at least 80% and be sold coiled, rather than linked.

=== Cheeses ===
Product	Designation (System)	Year Awarded	Notes
Beacon Fell traditional Lancashire cheese	PDO (UK, EU)	2007	Limited to cheese produced, processed and prepared in the Fylde area of Lancashire, including Preston and Blackpool. Products must be made from full fat cows milk and contain 48% butter fat, using traditional methods.
Bonchester cheese	PDO (UK, EU)	1996	Limited to cheese produced, processed and prepared within a 90‑km radius of the summit of Peel Fell. Products must be made from full fat Jersey cow milk, with a minimum fat content of 20% and a maximum water content of 60%, using traditional methods.
Buxton Blue	PDO (UK, EU)	1996	Limited to cheese processed and prepared within a 30‑km radius of Buxton and using milk from cows grazed in Derbyshire and the surrounding counties, using traditional methods.
Dorset Blue cheese	PGI (UK, EU)	1998	Limited to cheese produced, processed and prepared in Dorset. The product must be made from unpasteurised, skimmed milk from cows grazed in the Blackmore Vale.
Dovedale cheese	PDO (UK, EU)	1996	Limited to cheese produced, processed and prepared within an 80‑km radius from Dovedale, using whole milk from cows grazed in the surrounding counties of Derbyshire, Nottinghamshire and Staffordshire. The product must be produced using traditional methods.
Exmoor blue cheese	PGI (UK, EU)	1999	Limited to cheese produced in west Somerset, using traditional methods. The product must be made using Jersey cow milk, with a typical composition of 49% water and 34% fat.
Orkney Scottish island cheddar	PGI (UK, EU)	2013	Limited to cheese produced on Orkney, using milk from locally grazed cows.
Single Gloucester	PDO (UK, EU)	1996	Limited to cheese produced, processed and prepared in Gloucestershire, using traditional methods. The product must normally be produced from either pasteurised or unpasteurised Gloucester cows' milk. However, when this is not possible, milk from other breeds grazed in Gloucestershire can be used.
Staffordshire cheese	PDO (UK, EU)	2007	Limited to cheese produced, processed and prepared within the county of Staffordshire, using traditional methods. The product must be made from milk from cows grazed in Staffordshire or on silage sourced there.
Stilton white cheese	PDO (UK, EU)	1996	Limited to white cheese produced, processed and prepared in Leicestershire, Derbyshire and Nottinghamshire, using traditional methods. The product must normally be made using full-fat pasteurised cows' milk from cows grazed in the designated area. However, if this is not readily available this may be sourced from the surrounding counties of Cambridgeshire, Northamptonshire, Warwickshire, Staffordshire, Greater Manchester, Cheshire, Yorkshire and Lincolnshire. The cheese must have a minimum fat content of 48%. In the EU the cheese is registered with the blue cheese as "White Stilton cheese / Blue Stilton cheese".
Stilton blue cheese	PDO (UK, EU)	1996	Limited to white cheese produced, processed and prepared in Leicestershire, Derbyshire and Nottinghamshire, using traditional methods. The product must normally be made using full-fat pasteurised cows' milk from cows grazed in the designated area. However, if this is not readily available this may be sourced from the surrounding counties of Cambridgeshire, Northamptonshire, Warwickshire, Staffordshire, Greater Manchester, Cheshire, Yorkshire and Lincolnshire. The cheese must have a minimum fat content of 48%. In the EU the cheese is registered with the white cheese as "White Stilton cheese / Blue Stilton cheese".
Swaledale cheese	PDO (EU) (Note: UK registration was cancelled in 2022)	1996	Limited to cheese produced, processed and prepared in the Swaledale Valley, North Yorkshire, using traditional methods. The product must be made from full fat cows' milk, from cows grazed in the designated area. The product must contain a minimum fat content of 48% and a maximum water content of 48%.
Swaledale Ewes cheese	PDO (UK, EU)	1996	Limited to cheese produced, processed and prepared in the Swaledale Valley, North Yorkshire, using traditional methods. The product must be made from full fat ewe milk, from sheep grazed in the designated area.
Teviotdale cheese	PGI (UK, EU)	1998	Limited to cheese produced within a 90‑km radius of the summit of Peel Fell. The product must be produced using unpasteurised whole milk from Jersey cows. The product must have a minimum fat content of 48% and a maximum water content of 48%.
Traditional Ayrshire Dunlop	PGI (UK, EU)	2015	Limited to cheese produced within the traditional parish of Dunlop. The product must be produced using pasteurised whole milk (15 seconds at 72 degrees) from Ayrshire cows. The product has a fat content of 52.1% and a pH of 5.2-5.4.
Traditional Welsh Caerphilly / Traditional Welsh Caerffili	PGI (UK, EU)	2018	Limited to as a flat roundshaped cheeses produced in Wales of “Caerphilly” style.
West Country farmhouse Cheddar cheese	PDO (UK, EU)	1996	Limited to cheese produced, processed and prepared in Dorset, Somerset, Cornwall and Devon, using traditional methods. The product must normally be made from pasteurised cows' milk from cows grazed in the designated area. However, when this is not readily available milk may be used from the bordering counties of Gloucestershire and Wiltshire.
Yorkshire Wensleydale	PGI (UK, EU)	2013	Limited to cheese produced in Wensleydale, North Yorkshire. The product must be produced using whole milk from cows grazed in the designated area, which can be both pasteurised or unpasteurised.

=== Other products of animal origin (eggs, honey, various dairy products etc.) ===
Product	Designation (System)	Year Awarded	Notes
Cornish clotted cream	PDO (UK, EU)	1998	Limited to products produced, processed and prepared from milk produced in Cornwall and containing a minimum butterfat content of 55%.

=== Fruit, vegetables and cereals fresh or processed ===
Product	Designation (System)	Year Awarded	Notes
Armagh bramley apples	PGI (UK, EU)	2012	Limited to apples grown within the Archdiocese of Armagh, Northern Ireland (covering Counties Tyrone and Armagh and parts of County Londonderry). Products must be harvested between early September and late October.
Ayrshire New Potatoes / Ayrshire Earlies	PGI (UK, EU)	2019	Limited to immature potatoes of the species Solanum tuberosum of the family Solanaceae grown in the county of Ayrshire, South West of Scotland. They must be planted, grown and harvested within the defined geographical area (the areas of North Ayrshire, East Ayrshire and South Ayrshire councils). Potatoes are harvested from the beginning of May until the end of July.
Fenland celery	PGI (UK, EU)	2013	Limited to celery that has been produced in prescribed parishes in The Fens. The product must be grown on the "Adventurers 1 and 2 soil series 'deep peat soil which is naturally very fertile, deriving partially decomposed plant remains that accumulated under waterlogged conditions'", using traditional or commercial methods.
Jersey royal potatoes	PDO (UK, EU)	1996	Limited to potatoes grown, prepared and processed on the island of Jersey, using traditional methods.
New season Comber potatoes/Comber Earlies	PGI (UK, EU)	2012	Limited to potatoes produced in an area bounded by Ardkeen in the south, Crossgar and Killyleagh in the west and Castlereagh, North Down and Belfast in the east. The product must be planted in January and harvested between early May and late July.
Pembrokeshire early potatoes/Pembrokeshire earlies	PGI (UK, EU)	2013	Limited to potatoes grown in Pembrokeshire. The product must be planted in early February and harvested between May and late July.
The Vale of Clwyd Denbigh Plum	PGI (UK, EU)	2019	Limited to plums (Prunus domestica) grown in the Vale of Clwyd in Denbighshire North Wales.
Traditional Bramley Apple Pie Filling	TSG (UK, EU)	2015	The Pie Filling is a "homogeneous blend of Bramley apple pieces, sugar and water", using apples between 65 mm-115 mm in size, cut at a size larger than 15 mm.
Vale of Evesham Asparagus	PGI (UK, EU)	2016	Limited to green asparagus produced in the period April to July in the council bounderies of Malvern Hills, Wychavon and Stratford.
Watercress	TSG (UK, EU)	2021	Watercress is a plant in the cress family grown in flowing water using Nasturtium officinale seed at 10-12 °C. In the EU the terms is protected in several language variations as "Watercress / Cresson de Fontaine / Berros de Agua / Agrião de Água / Waterkers / Brunnenkresse". The term is only protected when accompanied with the term "made following the tradition of" followed by 1 or more of the countries: the United Kingdom, Belgium, Spain, France, The Netherlands or Portugal. Other use of the term Watercress remains possible, regardless of whether the process is followed.
Welsh leeks	PGI (UK)	2022	Leeks grown, harvested and packed in Wales can be designated Welsh leeks. They have a length of 28–35 cm and a width of 3.8-4.2 cm.
Yorkshire Forced Rhubarb	PDO (UK, EU)	2010	Limited to rhubarb produced within the Rhubarb Triangle (an area between Leeds, Wakefield and Bradford). Products must be produced using traditional methods.

=== Fresh fish, molluscs, and crustaceans and derivative products ===
Product	Designation (System)	Year Awarded	Notes
Arbroath smokies	PGI (UK, EU)	2004	Limited to products produced within "a coastal corridor with an inland boundary 8 kilometres radius from Arbroath Town House and extending to the community of West Mains in the north and the community of East Haven in the south" and purchased at designated Scottish fish markets. Products must be produced using traditional methods.
Conwy mussels	PGI (UK, EU)	2006	Mussels (Metilus edulis) of at least 2 years old, raked by hand with boats of a maximum length of 15 meters in the Conwy Bay and Estuary.
Cornish sardines	PGI (UK, EU)	2009	Limited to sardines that have been caught within an area no more than six miles off the Cornish coast. Products must be landed and processed within Cornwall.
Fal oyster	PDO (UK, EU)	2013	Limited to oysters that have been caught within the Truro Port Fishery ("all those parts of the Truro and Falmouth Harbours and of the bed of the Truro, Fal and Tresillian rivers containing an area of 2721 acres") using traditional vessels. Products must be caught between October 1 and March 31.
Isle of Man queenies	PDO (UK, EU)	2012	Limited to queen scallops that have been caught within the territorial waters of the Isle of Man.
London Cure smoked salmon	PGI (UK, EU)	2017	Limited to salmon cured only with rock salt and oak smoke produced in the London boroughs of Tower Hamlets, Hackney and Newham.
Lough Neagh eel	PGI (UK, EU)	2011	Limited to eels caught in Lough Neagh, Northern Ireland and the lower River Bann, using traditional methods. Yellow eels (immature Anguilla anguilla) must be caught between 1 May and 8 January. Silver eels (mature Anguilla anguilla) must be caught between 1 June and 28 February.
Lough Neagh Pollan	PDO (UK, EU)	2018	Wild fish (Coregonus pollan) caught in Northern Irish lake of Lough Neagh.
Scottish farmed salmon	PGI (UK, EU)	2008	Limited to Atlantic salmon that have been "conventionally and organically" farmed on the west coast of Scotland, the Western Isles, Orkney and Shetland.
Scottish wild salmon	PGI (UK, EU)	2012	Limited to Atlantic salmon caught up to 1500 metres from the coast of Scotland, using prescribed methods.
Traditional Grimsby smoked fish	PGI (UK, EU)	2009	Limited to fish that have been prepared and smoked in Grimsby, North East Lincolnshire, using a traditional method. Products must be either cod or haddock and weigh between 200g-700g.
West Wales coracle caught salmon	PGI (UK, EU)	2013	Limited to Atlantic salmon (Salmo salar) that have been caught in specific tidal areas of the River Tywi, the River Taf and the River Teifi. Products must be caught using traditional coracle fishing methods.
West Wales coracle caught sewin	PGI (UK, EU)	2013	Limited to Brown trout (Salmo truttta) that have been caught in specific tidal areas of the River Tywi, the River Taf and the River Teifi. Products must be caught using traditional coracle fishing methods.
Whitstable oysters	PGI (UK, EU)	1997	Limited to oysters caught on oyster beds in the vicinity of Whitstable, Kent. The product can include both the species Ostrea edulis and Crassostrea gigas.

=== Other products (spices etc.) ===
Product	Designation (System)	Year Awarded	Notes
East Kent goldings	PDO (UK, EU)	2013	Limited to hops prepared, processed and produced in a specific area of Kent, which includes the settlements "Tonge, Lynsted, Norton, Teynham, Buckland, Stone, Ospringe, Faversham, Boughton-under-Blean, Selling, Chartham, Chilham, Harbledown, Canterbury, Bekesbourne, Bridge, Kent and Bishopsbourne", using traditional methods.
Gloucestershire cider	PGI (UK, EU)	1996	Limited to cider produced in Gloucestershire, using locally grown varieties of cider apples. In the EU the cider is grouped with Gloucestershire perry under the same PGI.
Gloucestershire perry	PGI (UK, EU)	1996	Limited to perry produced in Gloucestershire, using locally grown varieties of perry pears. In the EU the perry is grouped with Gloucestershire cider under the same PGI.
Herefordshire cider	PGI (UK, EU)	1996	Limited to cider produced in Herefordshire, using locally grown varieties of perry cider apples. In the EU the cider is grouped with Herefordshire perry under the same PGI.
Herefordshire perry	PGI (UK, EU)	1996	Limited to perry produced in Herefordshire, using locally grown varieties of perry pears. In the EU the perry is grouped with Herefordshire cider under the same PGI.
Traditional Welsh cider	PGI (UK, EU)	2017	Limited to cider produced in Wales, using locally grown cider apples.
Traditional Welsh perry	PGI (UK, EU)	2017	Limited to perry produced in Wales, using locally grown pears.
Welsh laverbread	PDO (UK, EU)	2017	Traditional product made from laver (seaweed: porphyra umbilicalis), plucked from the Wales coastline and cooked exclusively with salt and water.
Worcestershire cider	PGI (UK, EU)	1996	Limited to products produced in Worcestershire, using locally grown varieties of cider apples. In the EU the cider is grouped with Worcestershire perry under the same PGI.
Worcestershire perry	PGI (UK, EU)	1996	Limited to products produced in Worcestershire, using locally grown varieties of perry pears. In the EU the perry is grouped with Worcestershire cider under the same PGI.

=== Beers ===
Product	Designation (System)	Year Awarded	Notes
Kentish ale	PGI (UK, EU)	1996	Limited to ale produced within Kent using traditional methods. Products must have an abv between 3.5% and 4.9%. In the EU the PGI is registered together with Kentish Strong Ale. The product is produced in a single company: Shepherd Neame
Kentish strong ale	PGI (UK, EU)	1996	Limited to ale produced within Kent using traditional methods. Products must have an abv between 5% and 7%. In the EU the PGI is registered together with Kentish Ale. The product is produced in a single company at the Faversham Brewery: Shepherd Neame Brewery.
Rutland bitter	PGI (UK, EU)	1996	Limited to bitter produced, processed and prepared within Rutland and Leicestershire, although packaging can take place elsewhere.

=== Bread, pastry, cakes, confectionery, biscuits and other baker’s wares ===
Product	Designation (System)	Year Awarded	Notes
Cornish pasty	PGI (UK, EU)	2011	Limited to products produced in Cornwall using a traditional recipe, with at least 12.5% beef and 25% vegetable content. Products can still be finally baked outside of the designated production area.

=== Salt ===
Product	Designation (System)	Year Awarded	Notes
Anglesey sea salt/Halen Môn	PDO (UK, EU)	2014	Limited to sea salt prepared, processed and produced in the Menai Strait, using traditional methods.

=== Wool ===
Product	Designation (System)	Year Awarded	Notes
Native Shetland wool	PDO (UK, EU)	2011	Limited to products produced in Shetland, using traditional methods. Products must come from pure bred Shetland sheep who have been grazed organically in Shetland.

=== Wines ===
Product	Designation (System)	Year Awarded	Notes
Darnibole	PDO (UK, EU)	2017	Limited to wine produced in a 5 hectare area (called Darnibole) from the Bachus grape, at a maximum yield of 56 hecotliter per hectare.
English	PDO (UK, EU)	2011	Limited to wine produced in England from grapes grown in the designated area, using prescribed methods. Products must use grapes from vines growing at a height below 220 metres above sea level. The product may be vinified outside of the designated area provided it is contiguous to England and prior authorisation has been granted from the Food Standards Agency. The product must conform to restrictions regarding alcohol content, acidification and sweetening.
English regional	PGI (UK, EU)	2011	Limited to wine produced from grapes grown in England, although production does not have to be within a certain area. The product must conform to restrictions regarding alcohol content, acidification and sweetening.
Sussex	PDO (UK)	2022	Limited to wine produced from grapes grown in East and West Sussex. The wine should consist mainly of Chardonnay, Pinot Noir, Pinot Meunier grapes, normally produced at 12 tonnes per hectares (with a maximum of 14 tonnes per hectare). The wine is available as a still wine and a sparkling wine.
Welsh	PDO (UK, EU)	2011	Limited to wine produced in Wales from grapes grown in the designated area, using prescribed methods. Products must use grapes from vines growing at a height below 220 metres above sea level. The product may be vinified outside of the designated area provided it is contiguous to Wales and prior authorisation has been granted from the Food Standards Agency. The product must conform to restrictions regarding alcohol content, acidification and sweetening.
Welsh regional	PGI (UK, EU)	2011	Limited to wine produced from grapes grown in Wales, although production does not have to be within a certain area. The product must conform to restrictions regarding alcohol content, acidification and sweetening.

=== Spirit drinks ===
Product	Designation (System)	Year Awarded	Notes
English whisky	GI (UK)	2026	Limited to whisky produced in England to the specifications outlined in the English whisky GI
Irish cream	GI (UK, EU)	1989	Irish cream is a blend of fresh Irish dairy cream in a flavoured/sweetened alcohol base which contains Irish Whiskey and other permitted ingredients. Production takes place on the island of Ireland.
Irish Poteen/Poitín	GI (UK, EU)	2008	Limited to a distilled drink originating from the island of Ireland, produced from cereals, grain, whey, sugar beet molasses or potatoes.
Irish whiskey/uisce beatha Eireannach/Irish whisky	GI (UK, EU)	2008	Limited to whisky that is produced on the island of Ireland. (Note: The protected geographical indication for Irish Whiskey/Uisce Beatha Eireannach/Irish Whisky covers both the Republic of Ireland and Northern Ireland.) The final product must not be sweetened or flavoured, other than the addition of plain caramel as a colouring. The product must have an abv of at least 40%.
Single Malt Welsh Whisky/Wisgi Cymreig Brag Sengl	GI (UK)	2023	Limited to whisky produced in a single distillery, which is located in Wales and produced through a batch process. All production steps (Mashing/Brewing, Fermentation, Distillation and Maturation) takes place in Wales and Welsh water is used.
Scotch whisky	GI (UK, EU)	2008	Limited to whisky that is produced in Scotland. The final product must not be sweetened or flavoured, other than the addition of plain caramel as a colouring. The product must have an abv of at least 40%.
Somerset cider brandy	GI (UK, EU)	2009	Limited to apple brandy produced in the county of Somerset. The product must have an ABV of at least 40% and have been aged for at least three years.

== Products which formerly had protected status ==
Product	Designation (System)	Year Awarded	Notes
Newcastle Brown Ale	PGI (EU)	2000	Until 2007, limited to beer brewed within the city of Newcastle-upon-Tyne. The PGI was cancelled on request of the sole producer, Scottish & Newcastle, when production was moved to Gateshead, outside of Newcastle-upon-Tyne.
Swaledale cheese	PDO (EU, UK) (Note: EU registration still active)	1996	Limited to cheese produced, processed and prepared in the Swaledale Valley, North Yorkshire, using traditional methods. The product must be made from full fat cows' milk, from cows grazed in the designated area. The PDO was cancelled under UK law on request of the sole producer, Swaledale Cheese company ltd, when production was moved outside Swaledale following an eviction notice on the original production location.
Traditional farmfresh turkey	TSG (UK, EU)	2000	The product is described as being superior in quality to standard turkeys. In order to be described as such the product must be produced using a specific method which includes using only birds which are over 20 weeks old, have been dry plucked, hung to mature and eviscerated after this period of hanging. Protection ceased on 4 January 2023 as a result of the end of a transition period for TSG's that had been registered under earlier legislation.
Plymouth gin	PGI (UK, EU)	2008	Limited to gin that is produced in Plymouth. The product must have a minimum abv of 37.5%. and have a predominantly juniper flavour. The PGI expired in 2015 after Pernod Ricard opted not to renew it, believing it unnecessary due to already owning the trademark for the name.

== Products proposed for protected status ==
In 2010, a campaign by Langage farm in Plymouth to grant Devon Cream tea Protected Designation of Origin status stirred controversy in Cornwall which also claims the dish.

In 2012, a bid by the Lincolnshire Sausage Association to grant the Lincolnshire sausage Protected Geographical Indication was rejected by Defra largely due to 95% of them being manufactured outside the county.

East End Pie and mash has been proposed for Traditional Speciality Guaranteed by the Modern Cockney Festival as well as Essex MP Richard Holden (British politician) with the plans receiving approval from ministers in 2024.

== List by country ==
PGI and PDO are linked to a geographical region and thus can be linked to a country. This is not necessarily the case for TSG products, where this is not a requirement. In the list below the geographical indications are grouped by country. For TSG, the grouping is with the location with which the product has most affinity.

Country (or Crown Dependency)	No. of products	List
England	47	Lakeland Herdwick, Traditionally farmed Gloucestershire Old Spots pork, West Country lamb, West Country beef, Melton Mowbray pork pie, Newmarket sausage, New Forest pannage ham, Cumberland sausage, Beacon Fell Traditional Lancashire Cheese, Buxton Blue, Dorset Blue Cheese, Dovedale cheese, Exmoor blue cheese, Staffordshire cheese, Swaledale Ewes cheese, Swaledale cheese, Stilton white cheese, Stilton blue cheese, Single Gloucester, Teviotdale cheese, Yorkshire Wensleydale, Cornish clotted cream, Fenland celery, Yorkshire Forced Rhubarb, Cornish sardines, Fal oyster, traditional Grimsby smoked fish, Whitstable oysters, East Kent goldings, Gloucestershire cider, Gloucestershire perry, Herefordshire cider, Herefordshire perry, Worcestershire cider, Worcestershire perry, Kentish ale, Kentish strong ale, Rutland bitter, Cornish pasty, English, English regional, Somerset cider brandy, Sussex, London Cure smoked salmon, Darnibole, Vale of Evesham asparagus, West Country Farmhouse Cheddar Cheese, English whisky
Isle of Man	2	Isle of Man Manx Loaghtan lamb, Isle of Man queenies
Jersey	1	Jersey royal potatoes
Northern Ireland	8	Armagh bramley apples, Irish Cream, Irish Poteen/Irish Poitín, Irish whiskey/uisce beatha Eireannach/Irish whisky, new season Comber potatoes/Comber Earlies, Lough Neagh eel, Lough Neagh Pollan, Traditional Bramley Apple Pie Filling
Scotland	16	Ayrshire New Potatoes / Ayrshire Earlies, Orkney beef, Orkney lamb, Scotch beef, Scotch lamb, Shetland lamb, Stornoway black pudding, Bonchester cheese, Orkney Scottish island cheddar, Arbroath smokie, Scottish farmed salmon, Scottish wild salmon, Ayrshire Earlies/Ayrshire Early Potatoes, Traditional Ayrshire Dunlop, Scotch whisky, native Shetland wool
Wales	19	Cambrian Mountains Lamb, Carmarthen Ham, Conwy mussels, Gower Salt Marsh Lamb, Pembrokeshire early potatoes/Pembrokeshire earlies, Single Malt Welsh Whisky/Wisgi Cymreig Brag Sengl, The Vale of Clwyd Denbigh Plum, Traditional Welsh Caerphilly / Traditional Welsh Caerffili, Traditional Welsh cider, Traditional Welsh perry, Welsh beef, Welsh lamb, Traditionally Reared Pedigree Welsh Pork, Welsh Laverbread, West Wales coracle caught salmon, West Wales coracle caught sewin, Anglesey sea salt/Halen Môn, Welsh, Welsh Regional
UK-wide	1	Watercress

== See also ==
- Agriculture in the United Kingdom
- English cuisine
- Northern Irish cuisine
- Scottish cuisine
- Welsh cuisine
- Cornish cuisine
- Wine from the United Kingdom
- List of Republic of Ireland food and drink products with protected status

== References and sources ==
=== Sources ===
- Application to register: Traditional Cumberland Sausage (PDF). Department for Environment, Food and Rural Affairs. 2007.
- Application to register: West Country Lamb (PDF). Department for Environment, Food and Rural Affairs. 2007.
- Application to register: West Country Beef (PDF). Department for Environment, Food and Rural Affairs. 2007.
- Application for registration: Article 5: Cornish Clotted Cream. Official Journal of the European Communities. 1998.
- Application for registration of a TSG: Traditional farmfresh turkey (PDF). Department for Environment, Food and Rural Affairs. 2007.
- Application for registration of a TSG: Traditionally Farmed Gloucestershire Old Spots Pork (PDF). Department for Environment, Food and Rural Affairs. 2007.
- Brown, Catherine (2004). Traditional Foods of Britain: A Regional Inventory (2nd ed.). Devon, UK: Prospect Books. ISBN 9780907325871.
- Barnard, Catherine (2013) [2004]. The Substfantive Law of the EU: The Four Freedoms (4th ed.). Oxford, UK: Oxford University Press. ISBN 9780199670765.
- Council Regulation (EC) No 510/2006 Application to register: Yorkshire Forced Rhubarb (PDF). Department for Environment, Food and Rural Affairs. 2007.
- Council Regulation (EC) No 510/2006: Melton Mowbray Pork Pie (PDF). Department for Environment, Food and Rural Affairs. 2007.
- Council Regulation (EC) No 510/2006 on protected geographical indications and protected designations of origin: Anglesey Sea Salt/Halen Môn (PDF). Department for Environment, Food and Rural Affairs. 2014.
- Council Regulation (EC) No 510/2006 on protected geographical indications and protected designations of origin:Armagh Bramley Apple (PDF). Department for Environment, Food and Rural Affairs. 2007.
- Council Regulation (EC) No 510/2006 on protected geographical indications and protected designations of origin: Cornish Pasty (PDF). Department for Environment, Food and Rural Affairs. 2007.
- Council Regulation (EC) No 510/2006 on protected geographical indications and protected designations of origin: Cornish Sardines (PDF). Department for Environment, Food and Rural Affairs. 2007.
- Council Regulation (EC) No 510/2006 on protected geographical indications and protected designations of origin: East Kent Goldings (PDF). Department for Environment, Food and Rural Affairs. 2007.
- Council Regulation (EC) No 510/2006 on protected geographical indications and protected designations of origin: Fal Oysters (PDF). Department for Environment, Food and Rural Affairs. 2007.
- Council Regulation (EC) No 510/2006 on protected geographical indications and protected designations of origin: Fenland Celery (PDF). Department for Environment, Food and Rural Affairs. 2007.
- Council Regulation (EC) No 510/2006 on protected geographical indications and protected designations of origin: Isle of Man Queenies (PDF). Department for Environment, Food and Rural Affairs. 2007.
- Council Regulation (EC) No 510/2006 on protected geographical indications and protected designations of origin: Lakeland Herdwick (PDF). Department for Environment, Food and Rural Affairs. 2007.
- Council Regulation (EC) No 510/2006 on protected geographical indications and protected designations of origin: Lough Neagh Eels (PDF). Department for Environment, Food and Rural Affairs. 2007.
- Council Regulation (EC) No 510/2006 on protected geographical indications and protected designations of origin: Native Shetland Wool (PDF). Department for Environment, Food and Rural Affairs. 2007.
- Council Regulation (EC) No 510/2006 on protected geographical indications and protected designations of origin: Newmarket Sausage (PDF). Department for Environment, Food and Rural Affairs. 2007.
- Council Regulation (EC) No 510/2006 on protected geographical indications and protected designations of origin: New Season Comber Potatoes/Comber Earlies (PDF). Department for Environment, Food and Rural Affairs. 2007.
- Council Regulation (EC) No 510/2006 on protected geographical indications and protected designations of origin: Orkney Scottish Island Cheddar (PDF). Department for Environment, Food and Rural Affairs. 2007.
- Council Regulation (EC) No 510/2006 on protected geographical indications and protected designations of origin:Pembrokeshire Earlies / Pembrokeshire Early Potatoes (PDF). Department for Environment, Food and Rural Affairs. 2007.
- Council Regulation (EC) No 510/2006 on protected geopgraphical [sic] indications and protected designations of origin: Scotch Beef (PDF). Department for Environment, Food and Rural Affairs. 2007.
- Council Regulation (EC) No 510/2006 on protected geopgraphical [sic] indications and protected designations of origin: Scotch Lamb (PDF). Department for Environment, Food and Rural Affairs. 2007.
- Council Regulation (EC) No 510/2006 on protected geographical indications and protected designations of origin: Scottish Farmed Salmon (PDF). Department for Environment, Food and Rural Affairs. 2007.
- Council Regulation (EC) No 510/2006 on protected geographical indications and protected designations of origin: Scottish Wild Salmon (PDF). Department for Environment, Food and Rural Affairs. 2007.
- Council Regulation (EC) No 510/2006 on protected geographical indications and protected designations of origin: Stornoway Black Pudding (PDF). Department for Environment, Food and Rural Affairs. 2007.
- Council Regulation (EC) No 510/2006 on protected geographical indications and protected designations of origin: Welsh Lamb (PDF). Department for Environment, Food and Rural Affairs. 2007.
- Council Regulation (EC) No 510/2006 on protected geographical indications and protected designations of origin: West Wales Coracle Caught Salmon (PDF). Department for Environment, Food and Rural Affairs. 2007.
- Council Regulation (EEC) No 2081/92: Isle of Man Manx Loaghtan Lamb (PDF). Department for Environment, Food and Rural Affairs. 2007.
- Regulation (EC) No 510/2006: Traditional Grimsby Smoked Fish (PDF). Department for Environment, Food and Rural Affairs. 2007.
- "Database of Origin and Registration". European Commission. n.d.
- "E-Bacchus". European Commission. n.d.
- English wine — Protected designation of origin (PDO) (PDF). Department for Environment, Food and Rural Affairs. 2007.
- English regional wine — Protected designation of origin (PGI) (PDF). Department for Environment, Food and Rural Affairs. 2007.
- EU protected food names scheme: protected geographical indication: Arbroath Smokies (PDF). Department for Environment, Food and Rural Affairs. 2007.
- EU protected food names scheme: protected designation of origin: Bonchester Cheese (PDF). Department for Environment, Food and Rural Affairs. 2007.
- EU protected food names scheme: protected designation of origin: Beacon Fell traditional Lancashire cheese (PDF). Department for Environment, Food and Rural Affairs. 2014.
- EU protected food names scheme: protected designation of origin: Staffordshire Cheese (PDF). Department for Environment, Food and Rural Affairs. 2007.
- "EU agricultural product quality policy". European Commission. 2014.
- "Geographical indications and traditional specialities". European Commission. 2014.
- "New framework for Quality schemes in agriculture enters into force". European Commission. 2013.
- Plymouth new bottle design. Black Friars Distillery. 2011.
- Product Specification: Buxton Blue (PDF). Department for Environment, Food and Rural Affairs. 2007.
- Product Specification: Dorset Blue Cheese (PDF). Department for Environment, Food and Rural Affairs. 2007.
- Product Specification: Dovedale Cheese (PDF). Department for Environment, Food and Rural Affairs. 2007.
- Product Specification: Exmoor Jersey Blue (PDF). Department for Environment, Food and Rural Affairs. 2007.
- Product Specification: Gloucestershire Cider (PDF). Department for Environment, Food and Rural Affairs. 2007.
- Product Specification: Gloucestershire Perry (PDF). Department for Environment, Food and Rural Affairs. 2007.
- Product Specification: Herefordshire Cider (PDF). Department for Environment, Food and Rural Affairs. 2007.
- Product Specification: Herefordshire Perry (PDF). Department for Environment, Food and Rural Affairs. 2007.
- Product Specification: Jersey Royal Potatoes (PDF). Department for Environment, Food and Rural Affairs. 2007.
- Product Specification: Kentish Ale (PDF). Department for Environment, Food and Rural Affairs. 2007.
- Product Specification: Kentish Strong Ale (PDF). Department for Environment, Food and Rural Affairs. 2007.
- Product Specification: Orkney Beef (PDF). Department for Environment, Food and Rural Affairs. 2007.
- Product Specification: Orkney Lamb (PDF). Department for Environment, Food and Rural Affairs. 2007.
- Product Specification: Rutland Bitter (PDF). Department for Environment, Food and Rural Affairs. 2007.
- Product Specification: Shetland Lamb (PDF). Department for Environment, Food and Rural Affairs. 2007.
- Product Specification: Single Gloucester (PDF). Department for Environment, Food and Rural Affairs. 2007.
- Product Specification: Stilton Cheese (PDF). Department for Environment, Food and Rural Affairs. 2007.
- Product Specification: Swaledale Cheese (PDF). Department for Environment, Food and Rural Affairs. 2007.
- Product Specification: Swaledale Ewes Cheese (PDF). Department for Environment, Food and Rural Affairs. 2007.
- Product Specification: Teviotdale Cheese (PDF). Department for Environment, Food and Rural Affairs. 2007.
- Product Specification: Welsh Beef (PDF). Department for Environment, Food and Rural Affairs. 2007.
- Product Specification: West Country Farmhouse Cheddar (PDF). Department for Environment, Food and Rural Affairs. 2007.
- Product Specification: Whitstable Oysters (PDF). Department for Environment, Food and Rural Affairs. 2007.
- Product Specification: Worcestershire Cider (PDF). Department for Environment, Food and Rural Affairs. 2007.
- Product Specification: Worcestershire Perry (PDF). Department for Environment, Food and Rural Affairs. 2007.
- Product Specification: Yorkshire Wensleydale (PDF). Department for Environment, Food and Rural Affairs. 2007.
- Regulation No 110/2008 of the European Parliament and of the Council. Official Journal of the European Union. 13 February 2008.
- "Protected food names: guidance for producers". Department for Environment, Food and Rural Affairs. 2014.
- Scotch Whisky verification (PDF). Spirit Drinks Verification Scheme — technical guidance. HMRC. January 2014.
- Welsh wine — Protected designation of origin (PDO) (PDF). Department for Environment, Food and Rural Affairs. 2007.
- Welsh regional wine — Protected designation of origin (PGI) (PDF). Department for Environment, Food and Rural Affairs. 2007.
- Ayrshire New Potatoes / Ayrshire Earlies Protected food name with Protected Geographical Indication (PGI). Department for Environment, Food and Rural Affairs. 2019.
