= List of Derbyshire cheeses =

List of cheeses from Derbyshire, England

This is a list of cheeses from Derbyshire in the United Kingdom.

== Derbyshire cheeses ==
Name	Image	Notes	Refs
Buxton Blue		A blue cheese that is a similar to Blue Stilton. It is made from cow's milk, and is lightly veined with a deep russet colouring. Buxton Blue cheese is a protected food name. It may only be produced in or around the town of Buxton using milk from Derbyshire, Nottinghamshire or Staffordshire.	
Derby		A semi-hard cheese made from cow's milk, with a waxed rind. It has been produced since the 16th century making it one of England's oldest cheeses.	
Dovedale		A cylindrical, blue-veined soft cheese made from cow's milk. Dovedale cheese is a protected food name. It may only be made within 50 miles (80 km) of the Dovedale valley.	
Sage Derby		It is made from cow's milk and infused with the herb sage, giving it a green marbled appearance. It was traditionally produced to celebrate harvest festival and Christmas.	
Stilton		A protected designation of origin cheese that is produced in two varieties: Blue known for its characteristic strong smell and taste, and the lesser-known White. It may only be produced in Derbyshire, Nottinghamshire or Leicestershire. Derbyshire stilton is made at Hartington (the smallest of the six makers of Stilton in the world).	

== See also ==
- List of British cheeses
- List of cheeses
- List of English cheeses

== Bibliography ==
- Jenny Linford, Great British Cheeses, Dorling Kindersley Ltd, 2008, ISBN 978-1405334365
