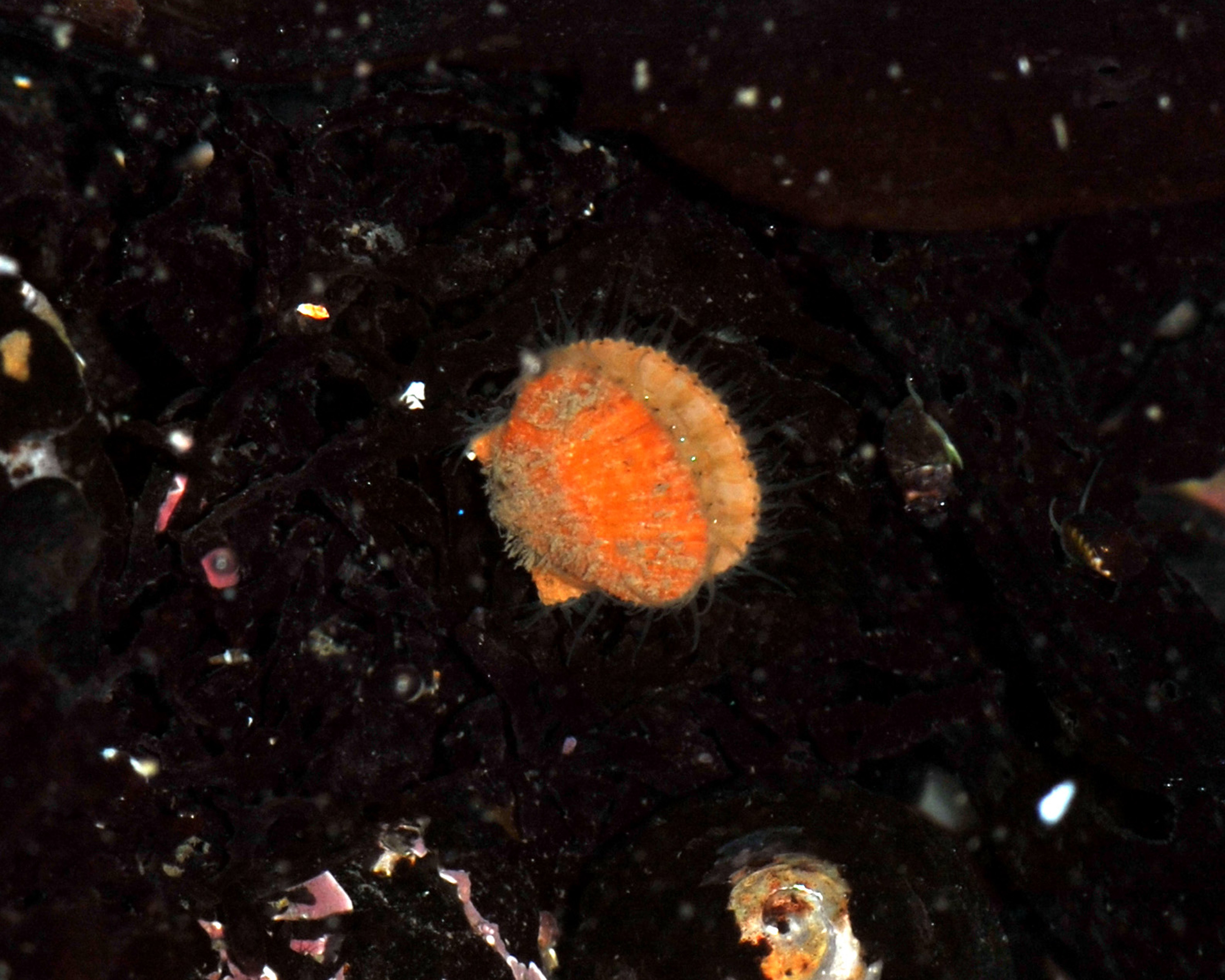

Scientific classification
- Kingdom: Animalia
- Phylum: Mollusca
- Class: Bivalvia
- Order: Pectinida
- Family: Pectinidae
- Genus: Leptopecten
- Species: L. latiauratus

Binomial name
- Leptopecten latiauratus (Conrad, 1837)

Synonyms
- Pecten monotimeris Conrad, 1837

= Leptopecten latiauratus =

Species of bivalve

Leptopecten latiauratus, common name the kelp scallop, is a small saltwater clam, a bivalve mollusk in the family Pectinidae, the scallops. It lives in water up to 850 feet deep. Like other scallops it has many small primitive eyes around the rim of its mantle and escapes predators by jet propulsion.

Other common names include the wide-eared scallop, broad-eared pecten, kelp-weed scallop. The species was formerly known as Pecten monotimeris.

== Description ==
=== Shell ===
The shell can be three to five cm in size. As is the case in most scallops, the shell is mostly circular with two flat auricles or ears that extend off the hinge. It usually has ridges that radiate out from the hinge toward the mantle. Some also have ribs perpendicular to the ridges. The shell is extremely thin compared to most bivalves, with one side extending out more than the other.

Orange, brown, red, and black are some of the more common shell colors. Often there some white mixed in. The color may be in a zigzag pattern.

=== Soft parts ===
Around the edges of the mantle are about 20 eyes on top and another twenty on the bottom. The animal also has approximately 50, 1–5 mm, somewhat transparent tentacles on each side of the rim of the mantle. This species has not been extensively studied, but based on what is known about the Queen Scallop (Aequipecten opercularis), a different member of the family Pectinidae, the tentacles may contain chemical sensors used to detect predators

== Ecology ==
=== Distribution and habitat ===
This species occurs from Point Reyes, California south to Cabo San Lucas, Baja California Sur, and Gulf of California, Mexico.

This scallop lives from the low intertidal zone to a depth of 250m (850 feet). It attaches to kelp, hard objects (rocks, oil well rigs) or invertebrates such as hydroids using byssal threads.

=== Predators ===
These scallops are eaten by perch and probably by other fish species.
