= San Matías Gulf =

Bay in Argentina

Coordinates: 41°30′S 64°30′W

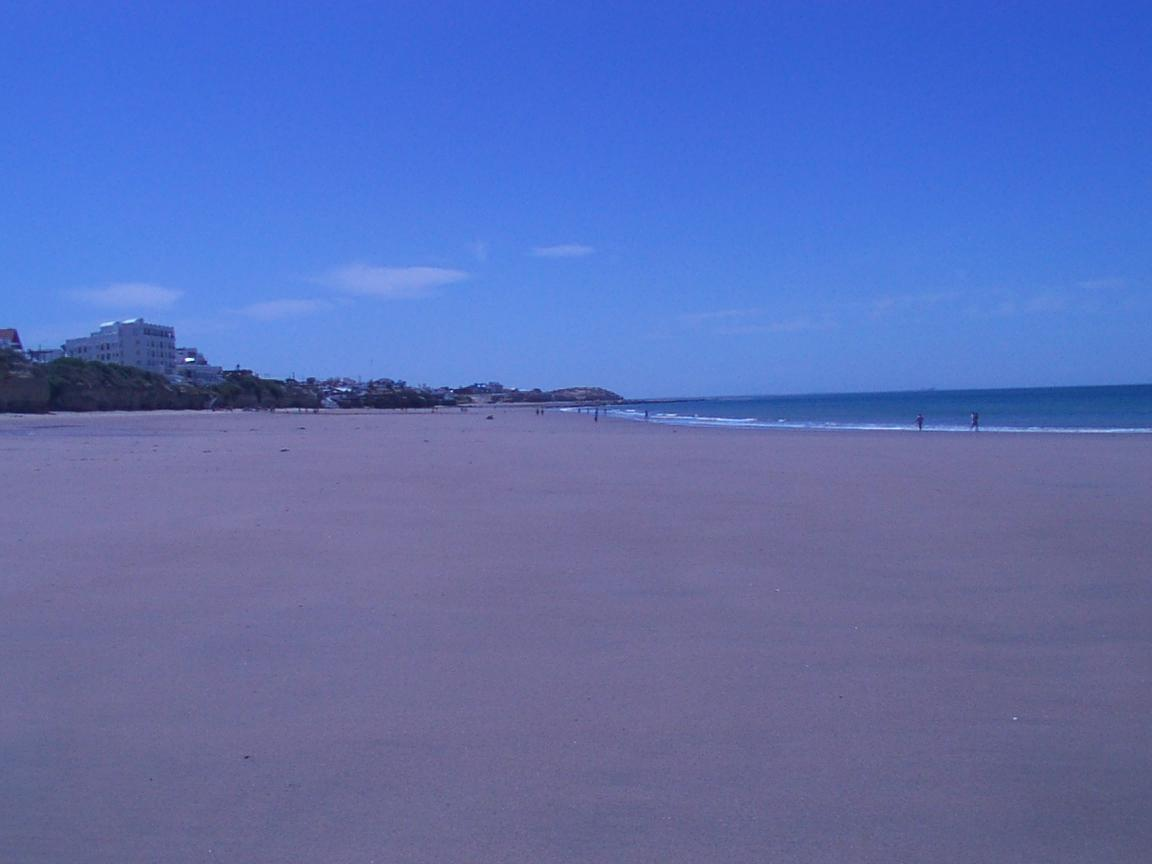

The San Matias Gulf is an inlet of the Atlantic Ocean off the coast of Patagonia, Argentina. It is bordered by the Río Negro Province to the north and west, and the Valdes Peninsula of the Chubut Province to the south. It is "one of the largest gulfs in the Patagonia region". The gulf is surrounded by plateaus and depressions below sea level similar to the gulf itself but that are not flooded by the sea at present.

The gulf was the subject of scientific investigation for its unusually large sand waves and their movement.

The local fishing industry may be unsustainably harvesting the purple clam (Amiantis purpurata), the Tehuelche scallop (Aequipecten tehuelchus), the blue mussel (Mytilus edulis), and the ribbed mussel (Aulacomya atra), as well as the Patagonian octopus (Octopus tehuelchus). The 2003 commercial squid harvest broke the previous record set in 2001 by more than double at 5,535 tonnes (5,448 long tons; 6,101 short tons). As of 2014, this gulf is the only location in the world where swimming with whales is permitted for tourism, with right whales.

The San Matías Gulf has a history of tectonic origin. Prior to the deglaciation that followed the last glacial period San Matías Gulf was a dry flatland below sea level. As global deglaciation went on after the Last Glacial Maximum sea level rose so that 11,000 years before present sea level surpassed the San Matías sill flooding the whole basin. This sill is currently 60 meters below sea level. The gulf has been repeatedly dried up and flooded during Quaternary glacial and interglacial periods respectively.
