= Newmarket sausage =

Type of English pork sausage

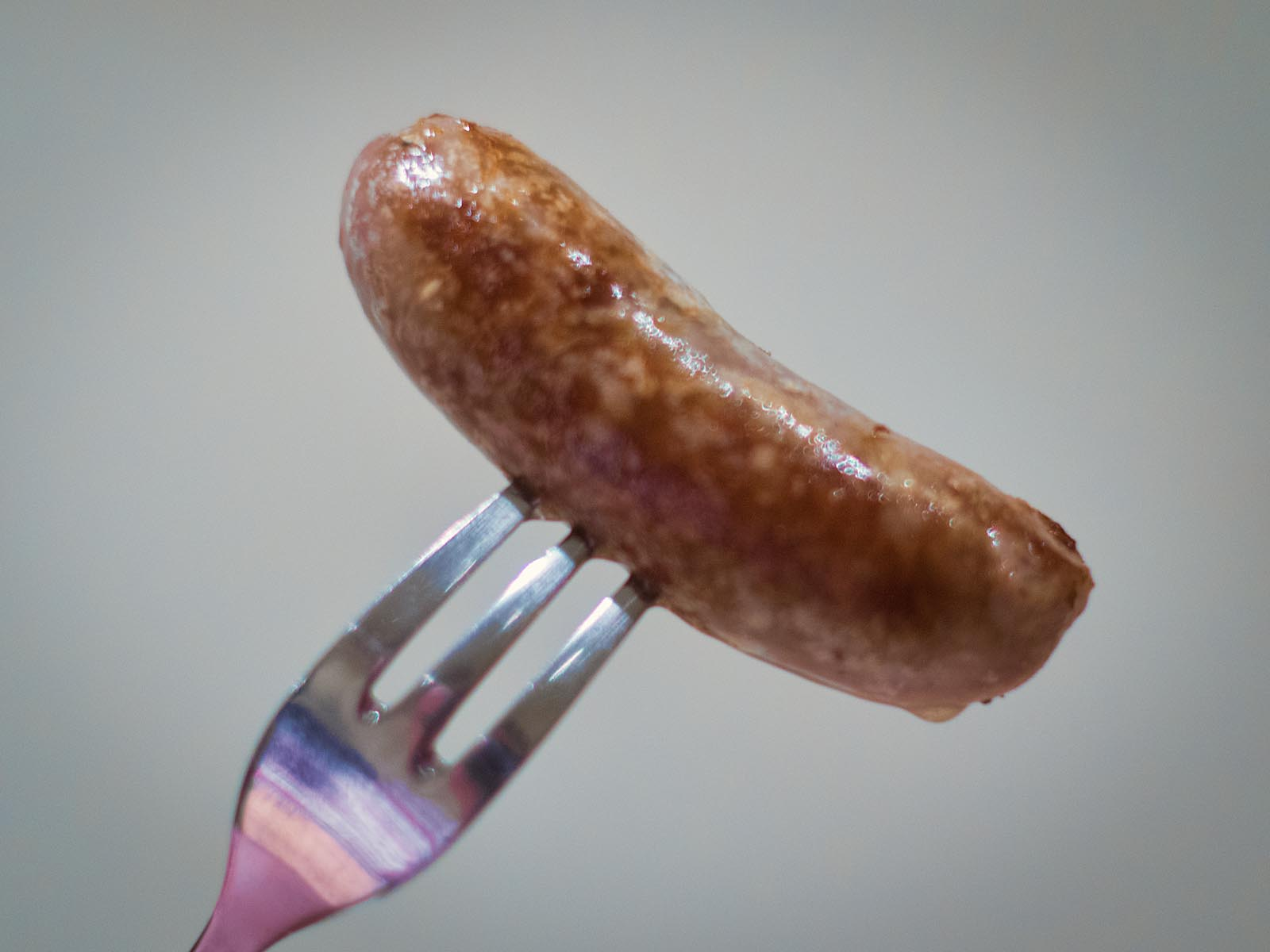
A cooked Newmarket sausage

The Newmarket sausage is a pork sausage made to a traditional recipe from the English town of Newmarket, Suffolk. Two varieties of Newmarket Sausage are made branded with the names of two different family butchers. Both are sold widely throughout the United Kingdom. In October 2012 the Newmarket sausage was awarded Protected Geographical Indicator of Origin (PGI) status. The flavourings used in a Newmarket sausage are black and white pepper, salt, thyme, parsley and nutmeg.

== Varieties ==
The three varieties of Newmarket Sausage are Musk's, Powters and Eric Tennant Butchers. The main difference between the three recipes is that Musk's uses bread as a filler while Powters and Tennants both use rusk.

Musks also produce a gluten free version of their Newmarket Sausage, in which the bread filler is substituted for rice.

All varieties have won several awards.

== History ==
Powters Sausages began in 1881 in what was a small butchery shop in Newmarket. Powters was originally started by the present owner Grant Powter's great-grandfather. During his time in the town, William Harper developed the recipe for what is now the Newmarket sausage.

Musk's sausages originated in the small village of Stetchworth, three miles from Newmarket. Elizabeth Drake, the owner of a butcher's shop in Tea Kettle Lane was widowed in 1882 and, in 1884, remarried to butcher James Musk in Deptford, Kent. She then began (or possibly continued) to sell the Musk's variety of sausages. These are believed to have been produced at Ivy House Farm where the Drakes were tenant pig farmers. Drake and Musk also had a shop in Market Row, Newmarket, from which they traded until moving to the High Street of Newmarket. James Musk died in 1905, a few months after opening the main shop on High Street, where the business traded until 1979. After his death, the business passed to James' stepson, Louis Frederick Drake (the Musks had no children), and later to his grandson Louis Gilbert Drake.

Musk's sausages were favoured by royalty and Royal Warrants were issued to Musk's from George V in 1907, Prince Edward of Wales (later the Duke of Windsor) in 1929, Queen Elizabeth, later Queen Mother, in 1965, and Queen Elizabeth II in 2005. It is not known whether Elizabeth Drake created the Musk's recipe and her new husband was the business influence to make it a success or whether James brought the idea back to Newmarket from Chiswick in London, where he had been working as a butcher in 1881.

== PGI status ==
In 2005, the European Union and the UK Department for Environment, Food and Rural Affairs tried to persuade the two companies to merge recipes and gain Protected Geographical Status, from which products such as Parma ham and Stilton cheese have benefited. It would mean their use of the Newmarket label would be protected to them for the sausage market, but it would also mean only one of the two recipes could exist. Faced with this problem, each party stands firmly by its own recipe, and neither wants to bow down nor merge recipes.

In November 2012, the Newmarket sausage received PGI recognition, all recipes co-existing as the European Union permitted the distinction between the recipes (including that of Eric Tennant Butcher's) and incorporated all the different ingredients listed in the application.

== See also ==
- List of sausages
- List of United Kingdom food and drink products with protected status
