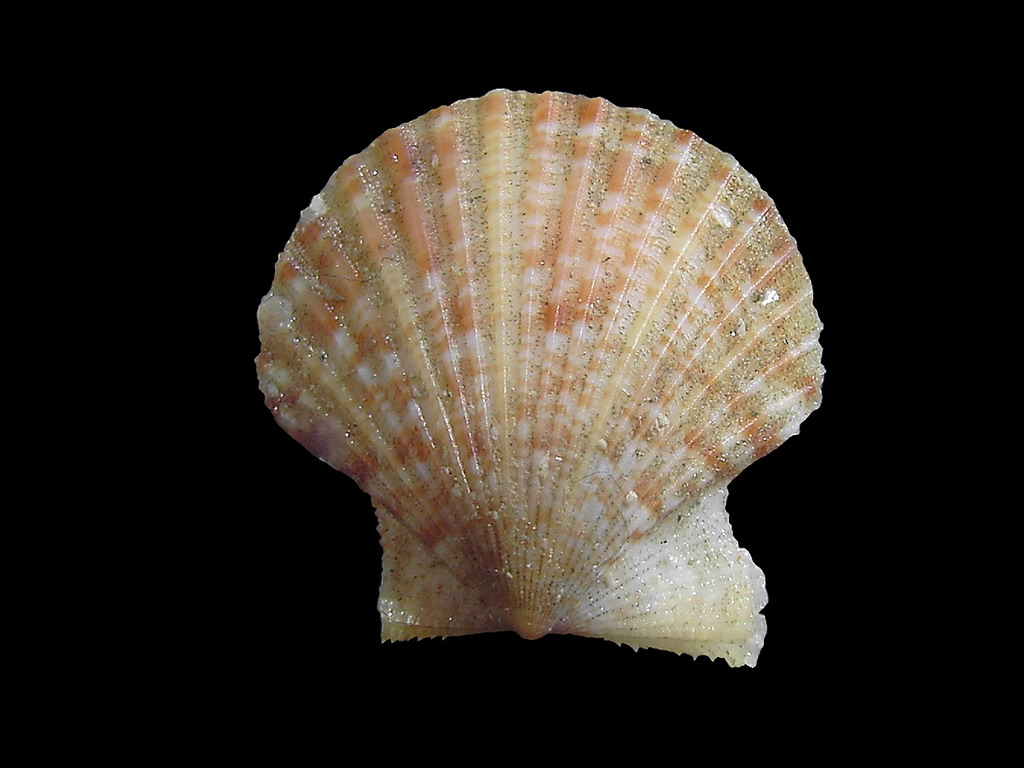
- Queen scallop, Aequipecten opercularis

Scientific classification
- Kingdom: Animalia
- Phylum: Mollusca
- Class: Bivalvia
- Order: Pectinida
- Family: Pectinidae
- Genus: Aequipecten; P. Fischer, 1886

Species
- See text

= Aequipecten =

Aequipecten Temporal range: Triassic - Recent

Genus of bivalves

Aequipecten is a genus of scallops, marine bivalve mollusks in the family Pectinidae.

== Fossil records ==
This genus is very ancient. It is known in the fossil records from the Triassic to the Quaternary (age range: from 247.2 to 0.0 million years ago). Fossils are found in the marine strata throughout the world.

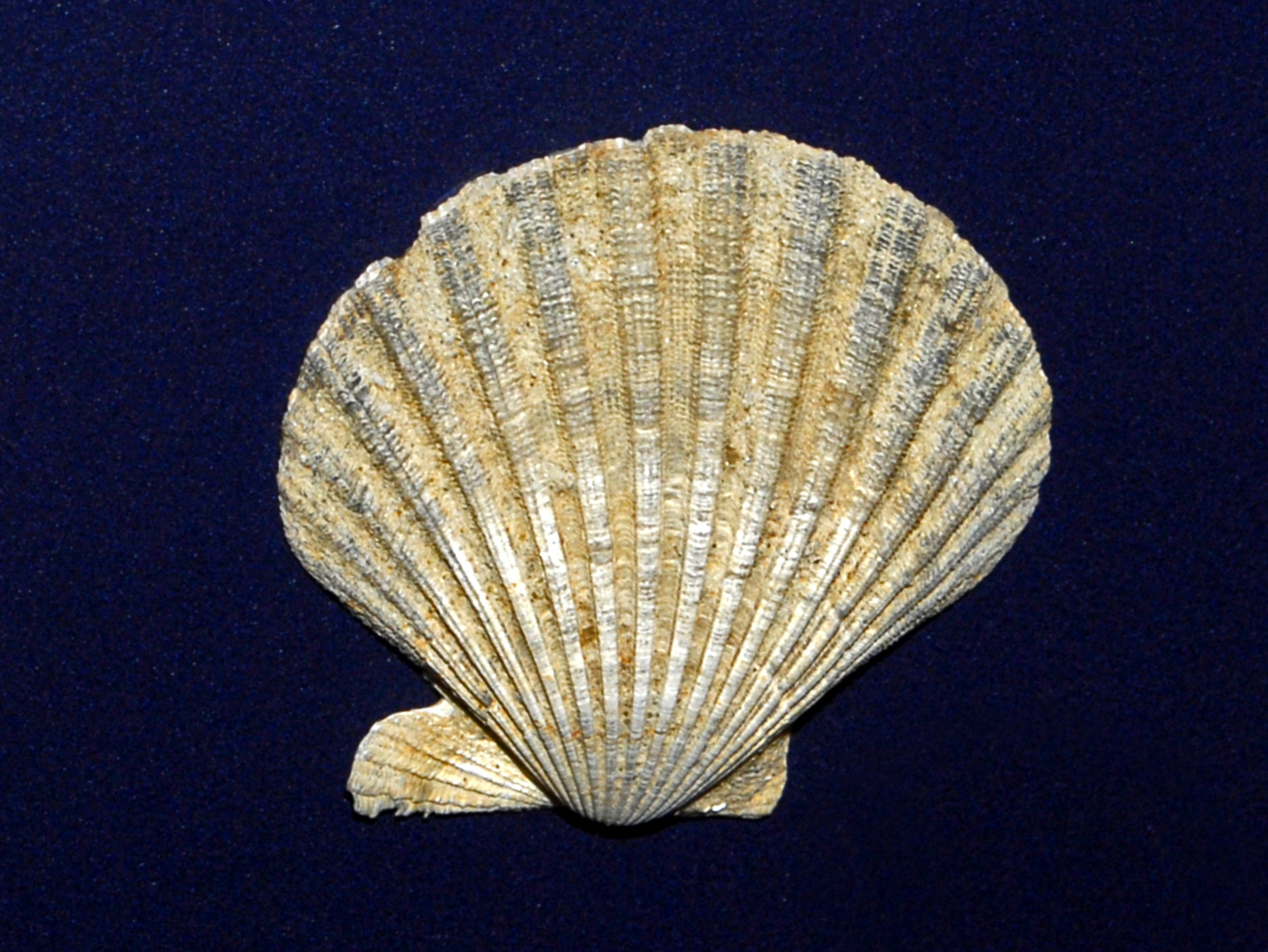
Fossil valve of Aequipecten radians from Pliocene of Italy

== Species ==
Species within the genus Aequipecten include:

- Aequipecten acanthodes (Dall, 1925) — thistle scallop
- Aequipecten audouinii (Paryaudeau 1826) — sometimes given as a subspecies of A. opercularis
- Aequipecten commutatus (Monterosato, 1875) — Canestrello scallop
- Aequipecten gibbus (Linnaeus, 1758) — calico scallop
- Aequipecten glyptus (Wood, 1828) — red-ribbed scallop
- Aequipecten heliacus (Dall, 1925)
- Aequipecten irradians — Atlantic bay scallop
- Aequipecten lindae (Petuch, 1995)
- Aequipecten lineolaris (Lamarck, 1819) — wavy-lined scallop
- Aequipecten linki (Dall, 1926)
- Aequipecten muscosus — rough scallop
- Aequipecten opercularis (Linnaeus, 1758) — Queen scallop
- Aequipecten tehuelchus (D'Orbigny, 1846) — Tehuelche scallop
