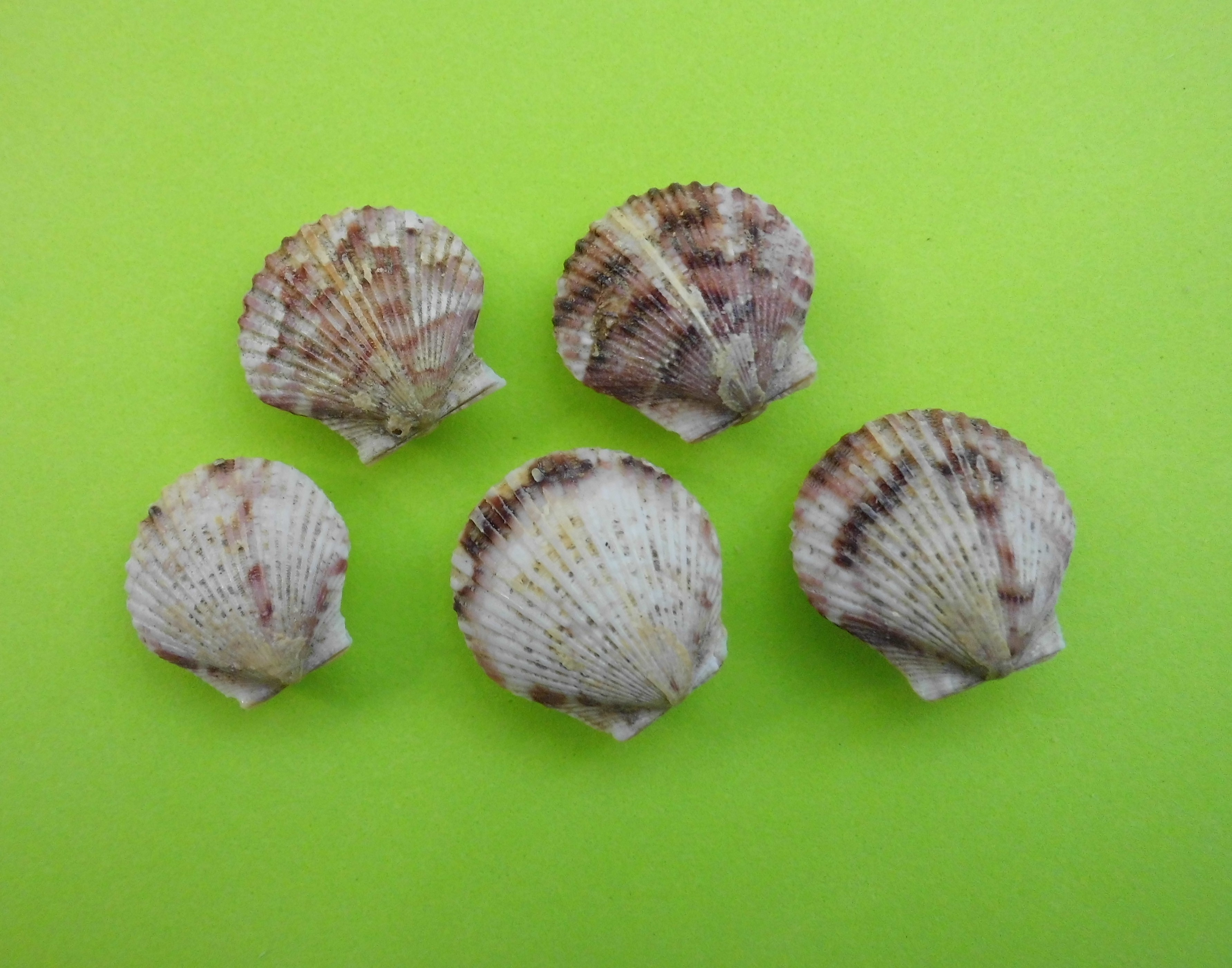
- The Atlantic callico scallop Argopecten gibbus

Conservation status
- Secure (NatureServe)

Scientific classification
- Kingdom: Animalia
- Phylum: Mollusca
- Class: Bivalvia
- Order: Pectinida
- Family: Pectinidae
- Genus: Argopecten
- Species: A. gibbus

Binomial name
- Argopecten gibbus (Linnaeus, 1767)

Synonyms
- Argopecten imitatoides Macsotay & Campos, 2001; Chlamys (Argopecten) gibbus (Linnaeus, 1758); Chlamys liocymatus (Dall, 1925); Ostrea gibba Linnaeus, 1758; Ostrea turgida Gmelin, 1791; Pecten (Chlamys) gibbus (Linnaeus, 1758); Pecten (Chlamys) liocymatus Dall, 1925; Pecten (Plagioctenium) gibbus (Linnaeus, 1758); Pecten (Plagioctenium) gibbus carolinensis Grau, 1952; Pecten (Plagioctenium) gibbus portusregii Grau, 1952; Pecten delessertii Chenu, 1843; Pecten dislocatus Say, 1822; Pecten gibbus (Linnaeus, 1758); Pecten liocymatus Dall, 1925

= Argopecten gibbus =

Atlantic calico scallop

Species of bivalve

Argopecten gibbus, the Atlantic calico scallop, is a species of medium-sized edible marine bivalve mollusk in the family Pectinidae, the scallops.

This species was once the basis of an important fishery, but in recent years catches have been low.

== Description ==
This species grows up to three inches in maximum width, and is similar in shape and sculpturing to the Atlantic bay scallop. Both valves of the shell are cupped. The shell near the hinge is extended into "ears", as is the case in all scallops. The shell of the Atlantic calico scallop has about 20 radial ribs, which are sometimes roughened by growth lines.

The exterior coloration of the upper (left) valve of this species is most typically a mottled pattern of purple on a cream background. The lower (right) valve of this scallop is usually whitish with small reddish or purple spotting on the sides. The interior of the shell is white, often with some beige coloration on the "ears" and top edge.

The eye-catching color of the shell of this species gave rise to its popular name; in the US, "calico" was for many years an inexpensive but colorful fabric printed with small flower patterns. The name is no longer in practice within the US.

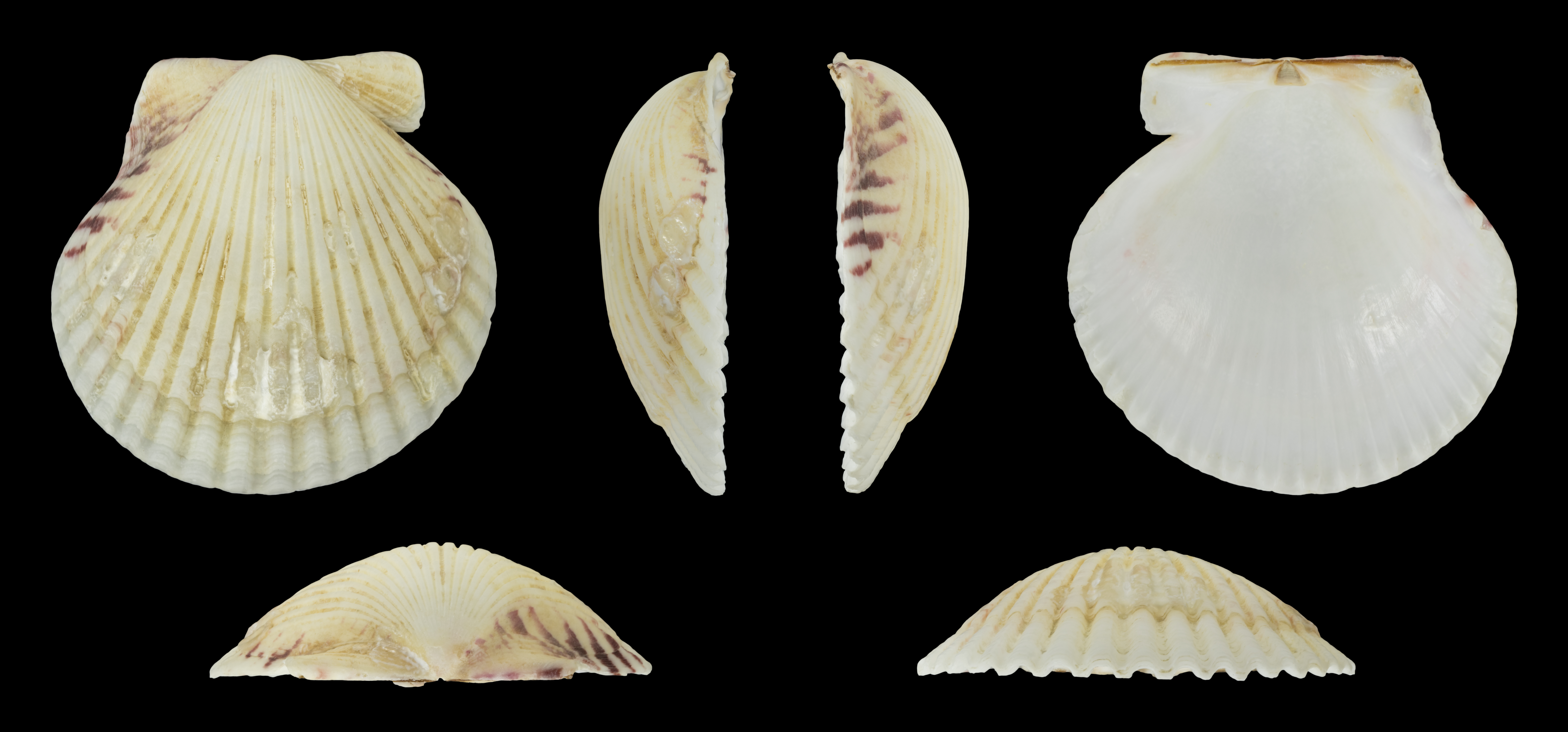
Right valve

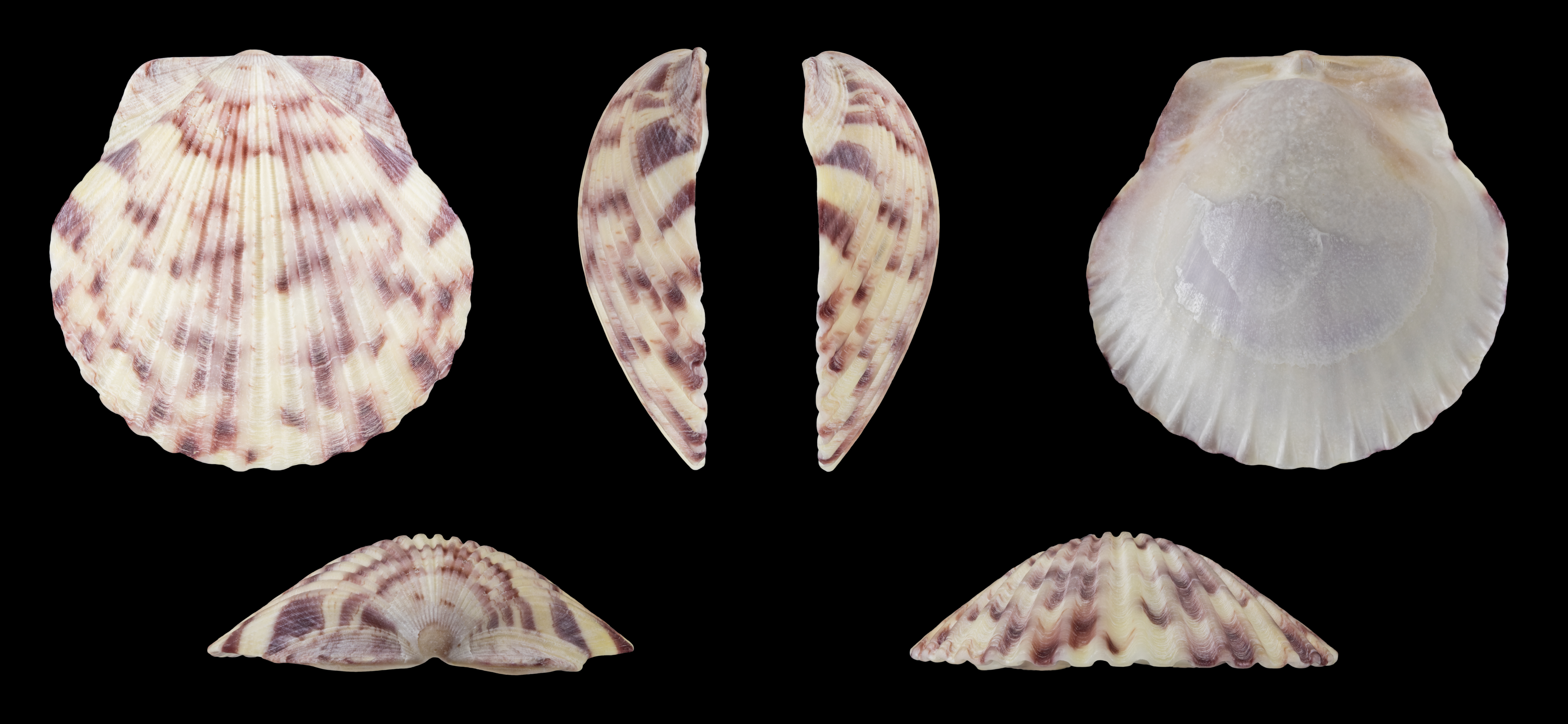
Left valve

== Habitat ==
The Atlantic calico scallop ranges from Delaware to Brazil, and is still sometimes fished commercially. It is not found in bays; instead it lives in open water up to 100-foot depths. The shells are commonly found washed up on ocean beaches.

Valve color and shell morphometry distinguish calico scallops from related species. In the Indian River Lagoon in Florida, two other scallops occur: the bay scallop, (Argopecten irradians), which generally has a uniform gray to gray-brown coloration with distinct convexity of the right (lower) valve. The other is the rough scallop, (Aequipecten muscosus), which has unequal 'ears' and has sharp scales on the lower surface of the ribs. The color of the rough scallop is yellow, orange, red or brownish.
