= Rough scallop =

Scientific classification
- Domain: Eukaryota
- Kingdom: Animalia
- Phylum: Mollusca
- Class: Bivalvia
- Order: Pectinida
- Family: Pectinidae
- Genus: Aequipecten
- Species: A. muscosus

Binomial name
- Aequipecten muscosus (W. Wood, 1828)

Synonyms
- Chlamys muscosus

Species of bivalve

The rough scallop, Aequipecten muscosus, grows up to 1.75 in (4.4 cm). It has a small, scallop-shaped shell with about 20 strong ribs which have many erect scales or small spines near the margin. The hinge line has ears.

Rough scallop

The coloration of the rough scallop shell varies from pink to a dark red exterior, often mottled with colors such as brown and cream, but it is also sometimes bright lemon-yellow or bright orange.

== Habitat ==
An offshore species: the shell is rarely found on ocean beaches. This species inhabits ocean waters from North Carolina to the West Indies. The Rough Scallop was frequently netted as incidental catch in commercial Atlantic calico scallop fishery.
