= Aequipecten acanthodes =

Scientific classification
- Kingdom: Animalia
- Phylum: Mollusca
- Class: Bivalvia
- Order: Pectinida
- Family: Pectinidae
- Genus: Aequipecten
- Species: A. acanthodes

Binomial name
- Aequipecten acanthodes (Dall, 1925)

Species of bivalve

Aequipecten acanthodes, the thistle scallop, is a species of bivalve mollusc in the family Pectinidae. It can be found in Caribbean waters, ranging from southern Florida to Bermuda.
