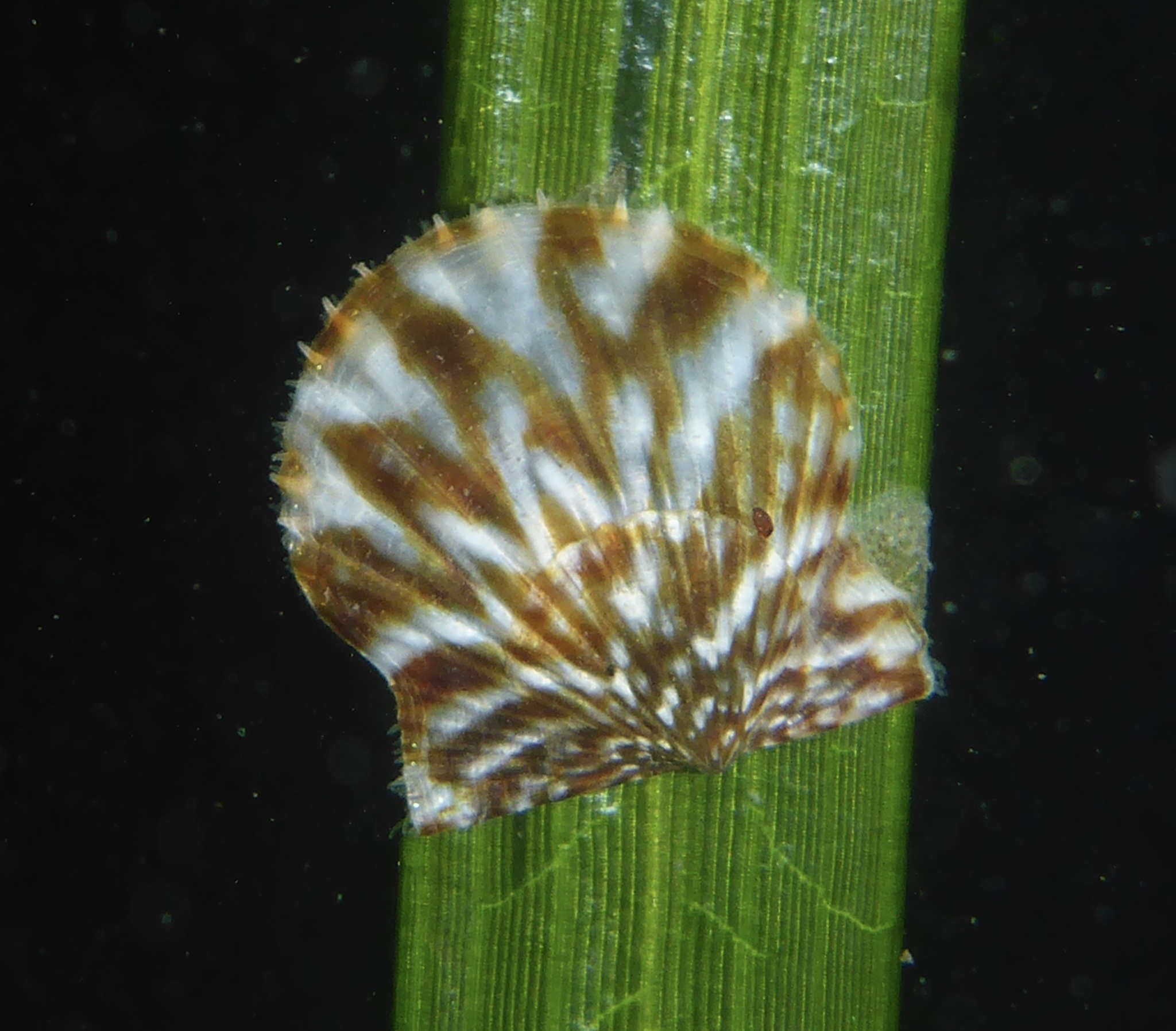
- Leptopecten latiauratus

Scientific classification
- Kingdom: Animalia
- Phylum: Mollusca
- Class: Bivalvia
- Order: Pectinida
- Family: Pectinidae
- Genus: Leptopecten; Verrill, 1897

= Leptopecten =

Genus of bivalves

Leptopecten is a genus of marine bivalves belonging to the family Pectinidae. The species of this genus are found in both Atlantic and Pacific coasts of the Americas.

== Species ==
There are nine recognized species:

- Leptopecten bavayi (Dautzenberg, 1900)
- Leptopecten biolleyi (Hertlein & A. M. Strong, 1946)
- Leptopecten camerella (S. S. Berry, 1968)
- Leptopecten euterpes (S. S. Berry, 1957)
- Leptopecten latiauratus (Conrad, 1837)
- Leptopecten linki (Dall, 1926)
- Leptopecten palmeri (Dall, 1897)
- Leptopecten tumbezensis (A. d'Orbigny, 1846)
- Leptopecten velero (Hertlein, 1935)
