= Comber Earlies =

Potatoes from Comber, Northern Ireland

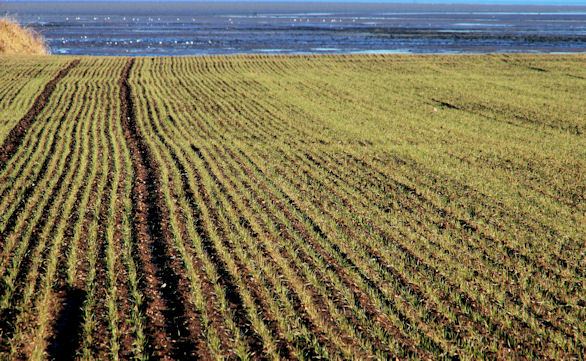
Potato field near Comber, next to Strangford Lough

Comber marked on a map of County Down. Only potatoes grown on the former Hamilton and Montgomery estates can be called Comber Earlies.

Comber Earlies, also called new season Comber potatoes, are potatoes grown around the town of Comber, County Down, Northern Ireland. They enjoy the status of protected geographical indication (PGI) since 2012 and are grown by the Comber Earlies Growers Co-Operative Society Limited.

The term applies to immature potatoes harvested between early May and late July in the area surrounding Comber. This area, sheltered by the Mourne Mountains and Ards Peninsula and protected from frost by the saltwater of Strangford Lough, has a distinctive microclimate, allowing an early potato harvest and a distinctive sweet, nutty flavour. Comber Earlies are not a variety of potato, they can be of many varieties, but are named solely after the location at which they are grown.

== History ==
Comber potatoes have long been linked with the Ulster Scots planters the Hamiltons and Montgomerys. The first written mention of potatoes being grown in Ireland, in 1606, mentions Comber.

== See also ==
- Northern Irish cuisine
- List of United Kingdom food and drink products with protected status
