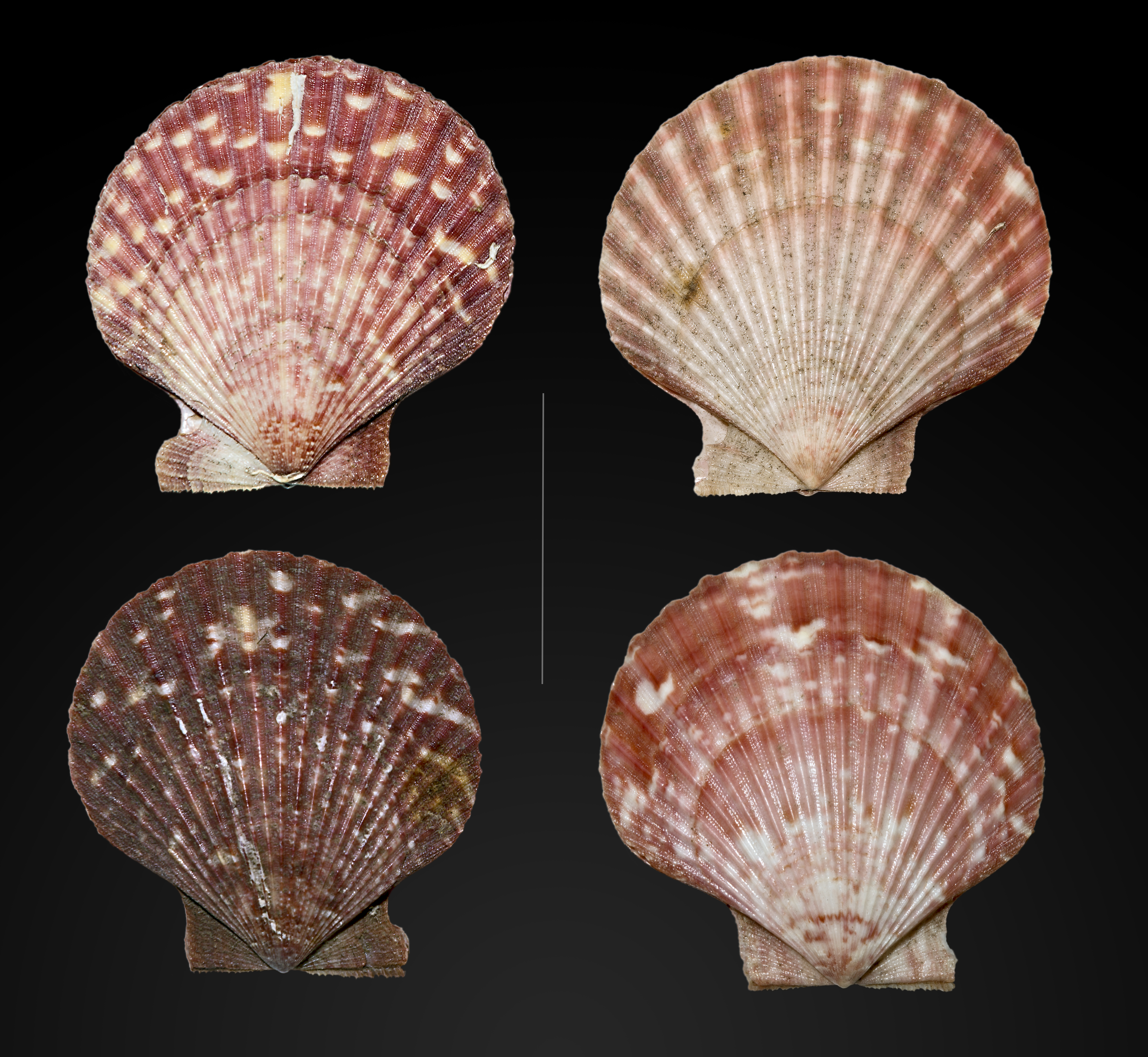
- View of two valves of two Aequipecten opercularis

Scientific classification
- Kingdom: Animalia
- Phylum: Mollusca
- Class: Bivalvia
- Order: Pectinida
- Family: Pectinidae
- Genus: Aequipecten
- Species: A. opercularis

Binomial name
- Aequipecten opercularis (Linnaeus, 1758)

Synonyms
- Pecten opercularis Linnaeus, 1758

= Queen scallop =

Species of bivalve

The queen scallop (Aequipecten opercularis) is a medium-sized species of scallop, an edible marine bivalve mollusk in the family Pectinidae, the scallops. It is found in the northeast Atlantic and is important in fisheries.

== Description ==
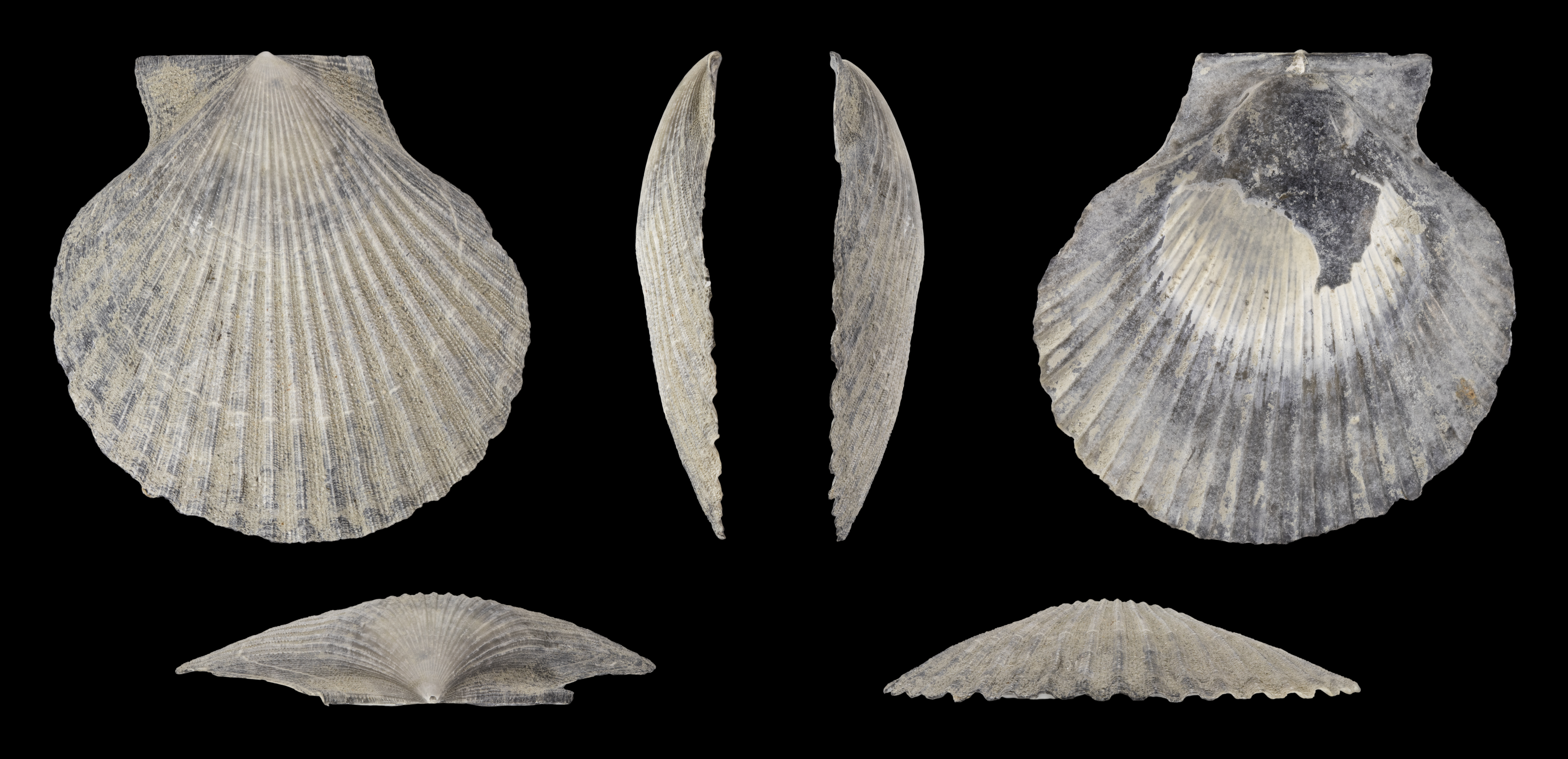
Left valve from the Pliocene of Italy

At about 7 cm (3 in) in size, this is one of the smaller scallop species which are commercially exploited. The shell of this species is sometimes quite colourful, and it is also thin and brittle. It has about twenty radiating ribs. The left valve is slightly more convex than the right one. One auricle of the right valve is larger than the other which creates a notch near the hinge used by the modified foot in young scallops to spin byssal threads. Older scallops are free swimming.

Right and left valve of the same specimen:

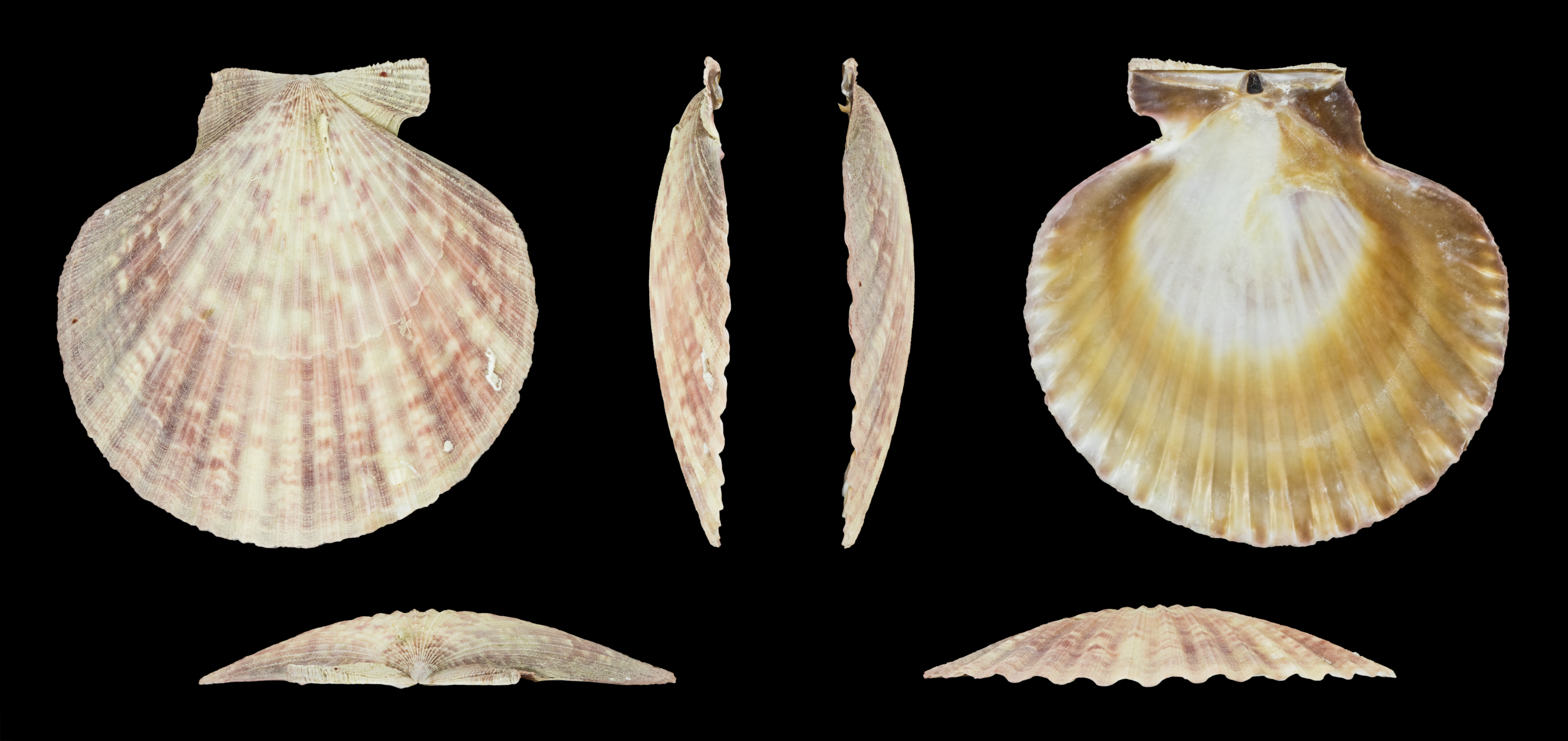
Right valve

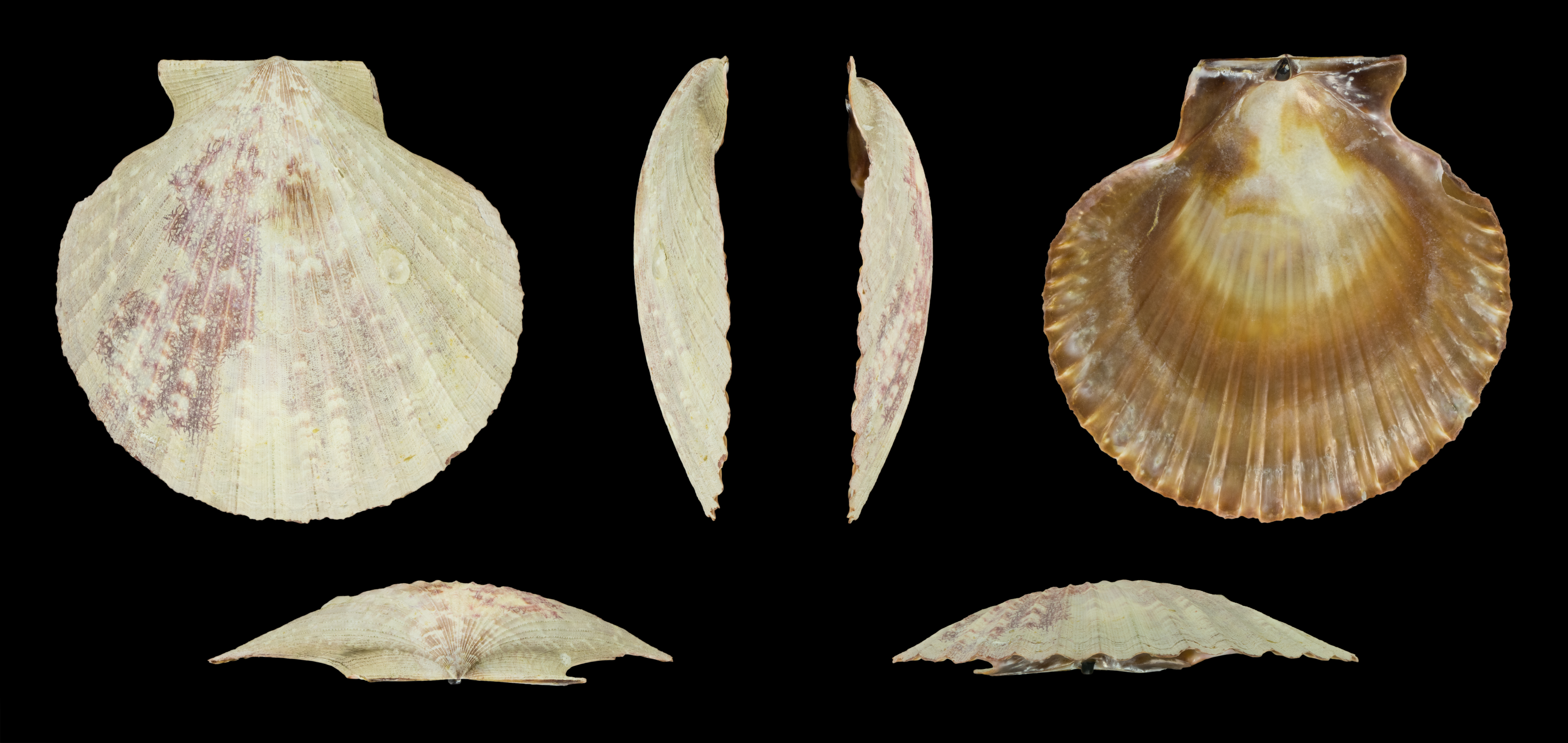
Left valve

== Life habits ==
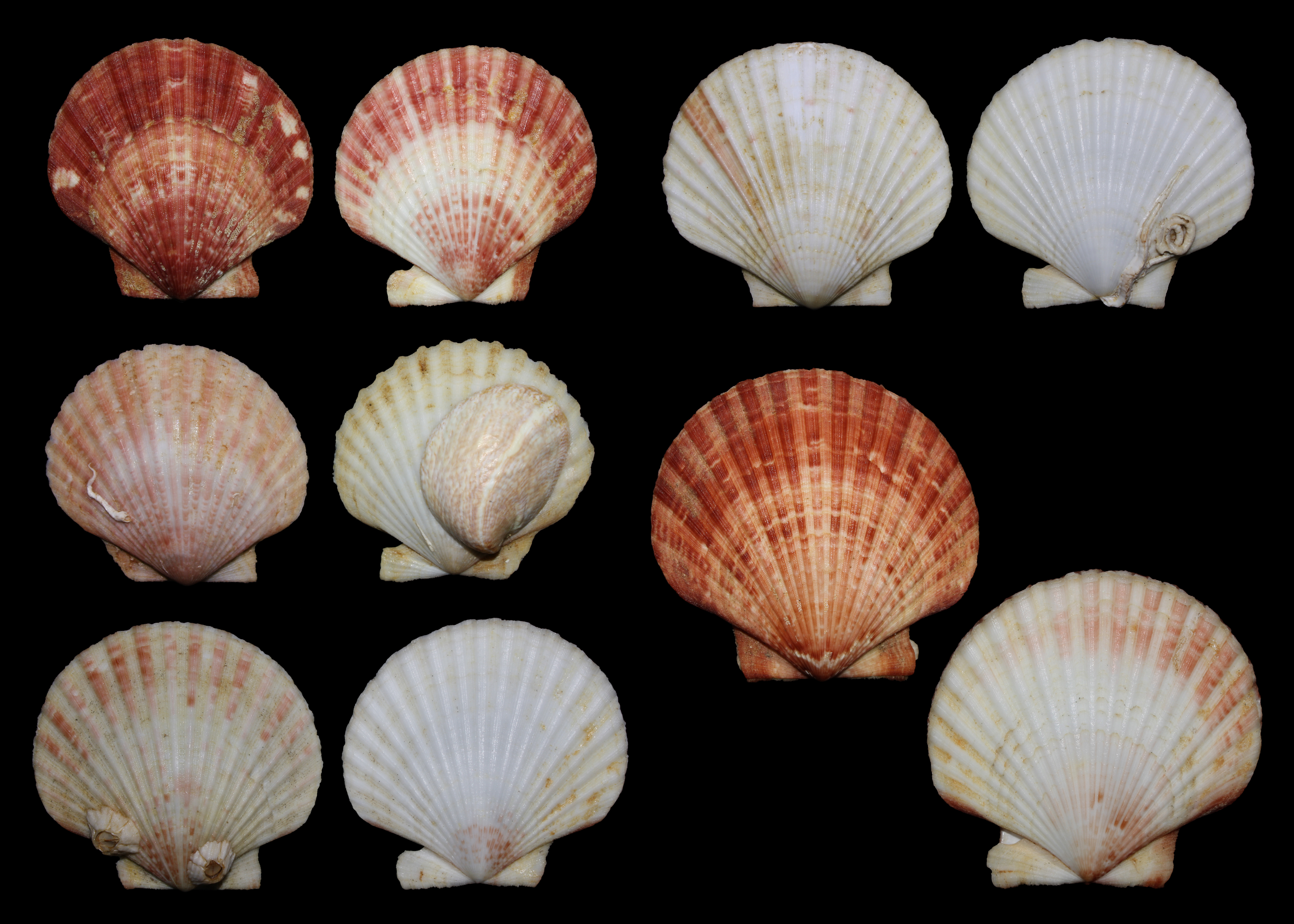
Several shells of queen scallop

The queen scallop feeds on a diet of plankton, and is commonly found up to 40 m (130 ft) below mean sea level, although it has been known to exist up to 400 m (1,300 ft) below sea level. This species is distributed from Norway south to the Canary Islands and the Mediterranean and is common in the North Sea on beds of sand and gravel.

== Fishery around the Isle of Man ==
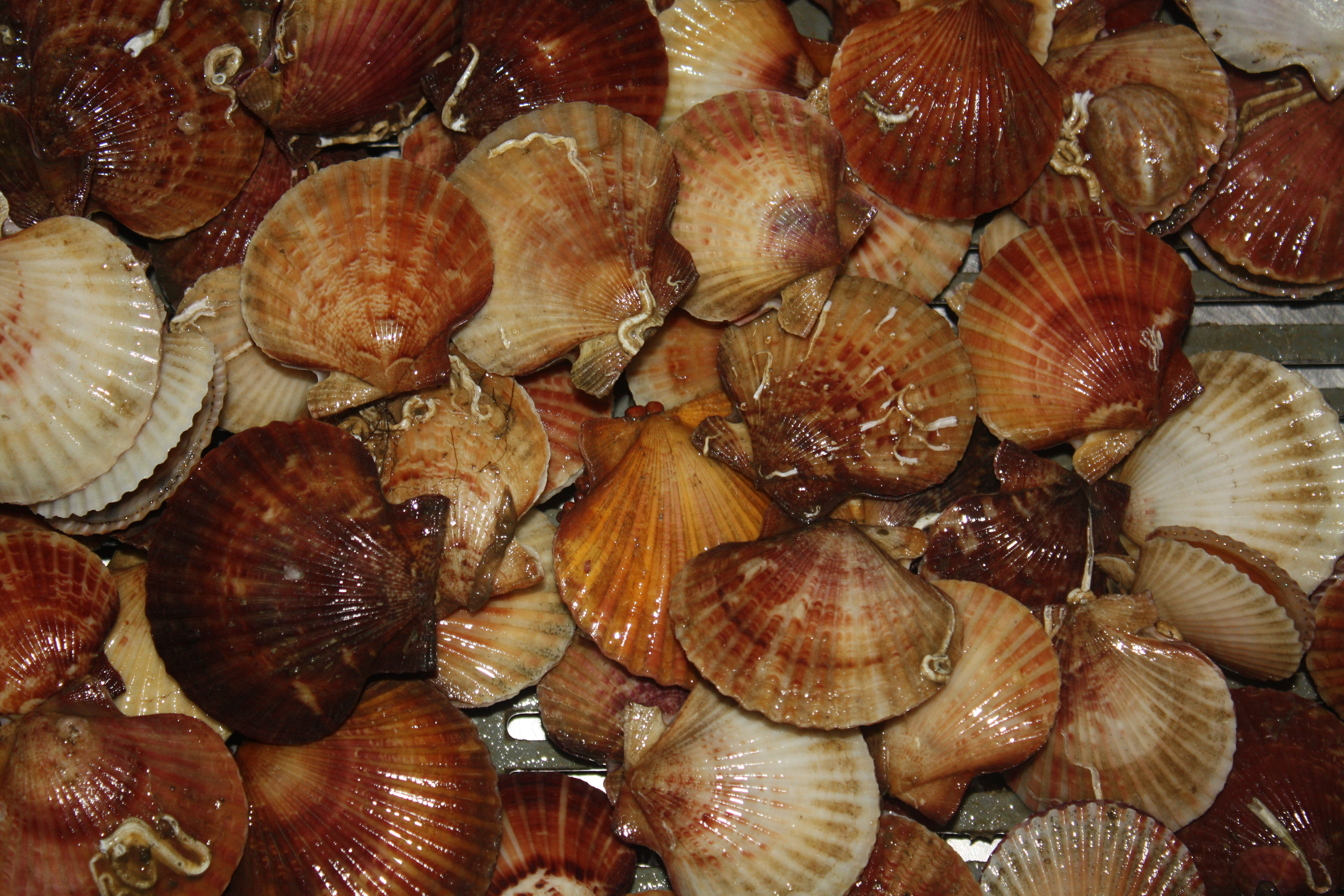
Queen scallop caught in fisheries

The Isle of Man in the British Isles is famous for the queen scallop, or "Manx queenie" as it is known locally. Due to the vagaries of landings over the years, Manx fishermen have worked on technical conservation regulations, in order to ensure that stocks of the queenie have remained robust. These have included restrictions on fishing times, closed seasons, and limitations on the number of dredges permitted. There are also two conservation areas in the island's territorial waters; one has been in place since 1989 and the other was created in 2008; these areas are closed to mobile fishing. These conservation areas are supported by the fishing industry; the fishermen themselves started the initiative to create the Douglas closed area. Data analysis appears to support the viability of these areas, which appear to help ensure that the Manx queenie can be fished sustainably.

The Isle of Man Queenie Festival is an annual, week-long celebration of the Manx queenie, with many restaurants, hotels and pubs serving queen scallops. This festival includes various events including sailing, diving, barbecues, beach days, sea swims, entertainment and plenty of queen scallops.

Isle of Man queenies have been awarded the European Union Protected Designation of Origin (PDO) stamp.
