= Modern Cockney Festival =

Cultural festival held annually in London and online

- Genre: Arts / Comedy / Heritage / Walking tours / Linguistics
- Locations: East London and online (hybrid)
- Years active: 2022–present
- Website: moderncockneyfestival.co.uk

The Modern Cockney Festival is an independent cultural festival in London, England, celebrating and exploring contemporary Cockney identity, culture and heritage. It was founded in 2022 as a partnership between social enterprise Grow Social Capital CIC and The Bengali East End Heritage Society.

It is held annually during the month of March with one-off events at other times during the year.

In 2026, to mark the 90th anniversary of the Battle of Cable Street, the Modern Cockney Festival and Unite East End held a commemoration of the events of Sunday 4 October 1936 when the British Union of Fascists (BUF) marched in East London to celebrate the fourth anniversary of their organisation, but were met by a broad coalition of people resisting their efforts.

In October 2024, following an event about Cockney cuisine in the 2023 edition, the Festival secured the first debate in the House of Commons on whether pie and mash needed to be granted traditional speciality guaranteed protection.
