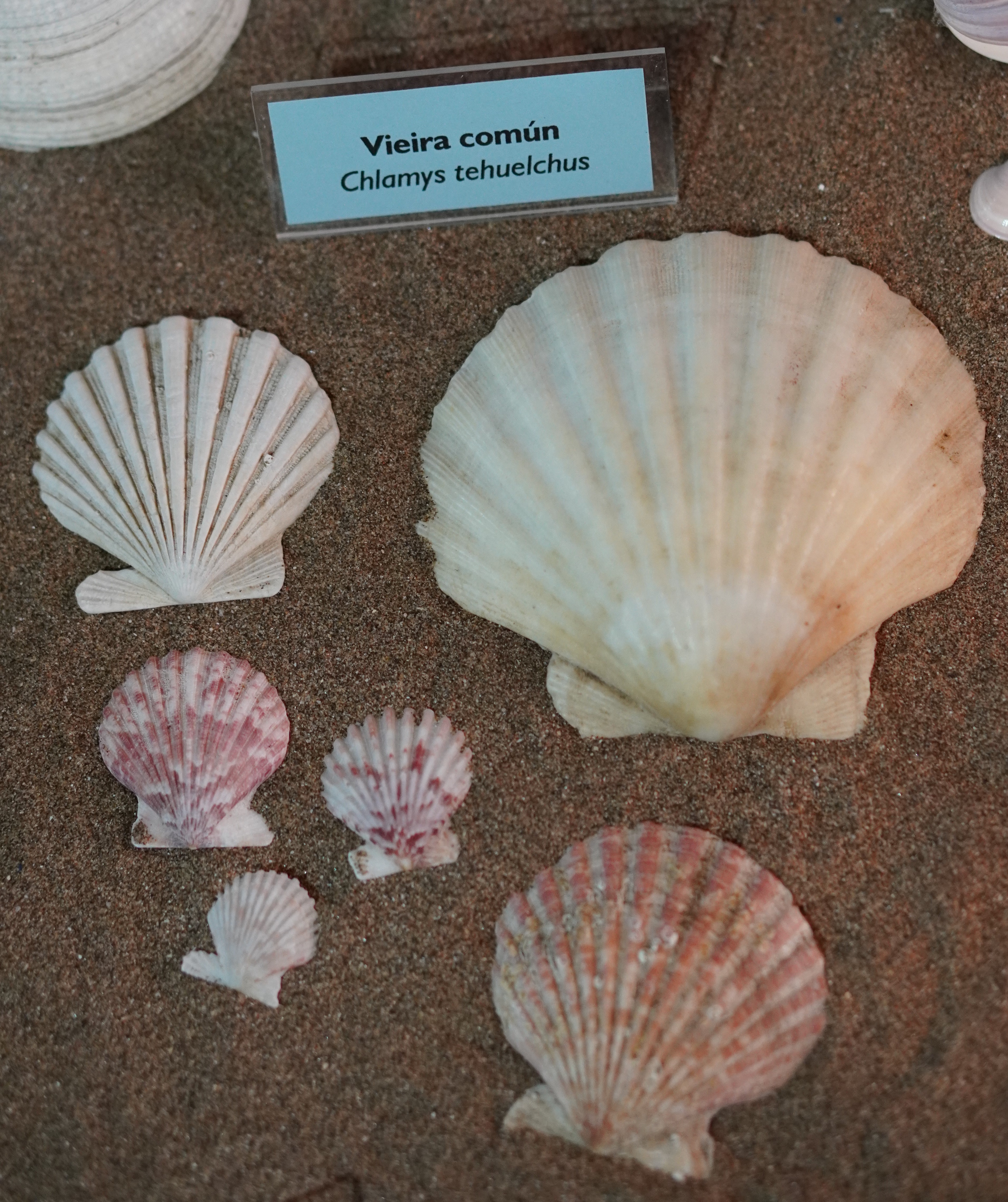

Scientific classification
- Domain: Eukaryota
- Kingdom: Animalia
- Phylum: Mollusca
- Class: Bivalvia
- Order: Pectinida
- Family: Pectinidae
- Genus: Aequipecten
- Species: A. tehuelchus

Binomial name
- Aequipecten tehuelchus (d'Orbigny, 1842)

= Aequipecten tehuelchus =

Species of bivalve

Aequipecten tehuelchus is a species of bivalves belonging to the family Pectinidae.

The species is found in South America. Its shell changes shape and size in three different stages throughout its lifetime: spat, juvenile, and adult.
