= Teviotdale cheese =

Full fat hard cheese produced in the area of Teviotdale

Teviotdale
- Country of origin: Scotland and England
- Region: Teviotdale, border lands of Scotland and England
- Source of milk: Cow
- Pasteurised: Unpasteurised
- Texture: firm
- Fat content: 48% minimum
- Certification: PGI
- Named after: Teviotdale[*]

Teviotdale is a full fat hard cheese produced in the area of Teviotdale on the border lands between Scotland and England, within a radius of 90 km from the summit of Peel Fell in the Cheviot Hills. The cheese is produced from the milk of the Jersey cattle. There are no known current producers of this cheese.

== Description ==
The cheeses are cylindrical in shape with a white coating, a yellow smooth paste and a salty flavour.

== Production ==
Milk is heated to 32 °C and after rennet is added, left to incubate for 90 minutes at a temperature between 25 °C and 32 °C. An hour later, the curds are cut and settle for 20 minutes before being moulded and mechanically pressed. The cheeses are left in brine at 13 °C for 9 hours after which they are removed to mature. They are dried for 4 days and left to mature for 15 days, whilst being turned daily.

== Awards ==
Teviotdale cheese was awarded European Protected Geographical Status (PGI) status.
