= Dovedale cheese =

British blue cheese from the Peak District

Dovedale
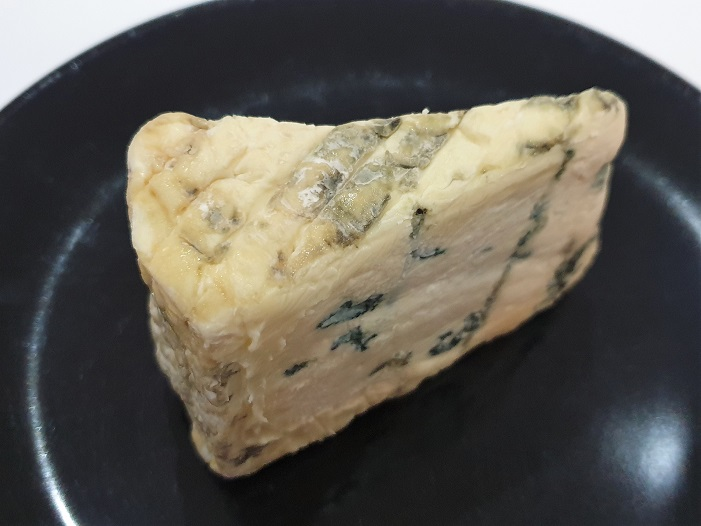
- Dovedale soft blue cheese from Derbyshire, England
- Other names: Dovedale Blue
- Country of origin: England
- Region: Derbyshire, Nottinghamshire, Staffordshire
- Source of milk: Cows
- Pasteurised: Yes
- Texture: Soft
- Aging time: 3–4 weeks
- Certification: PDO 2007
- Named after: Dovedale

Dovedale, sold as Dovedale Blue, is a blue cheese. It is named after the Dovedale valley in the Peak District, near where it is produced.

Dovedale is a soft, creamy cheese with a mild blue flavour. It is made from full fat cow's milk. Unusually for a British cheese, it is brine dipped, rather than dry-salted, giving it a distinctive continental appearance and flavour.

In 2007, Dovedale was awarded Protected designation of origin (PDO) status, meaning that it must be traditionally manufactured within 50 miles (80 km) of the Dovedale valley. The original cheese was invented and is still produced at the Hartington Creamery in Derbyshire; a version is also produced by the Staffordshire Cheese Company in Cheddleton, Staffordshire.
