= Buxton Blue =

British cheese

- Country of origin: England
- Region, town: Buxton
- Source of milk: Cows
- Certification: PDO
- Named after: Buxton

Buxton Blue is an English blue cheese that is a close relative of Blue Stilton, is made from cow's milk, and is lightly veined with a deep russet colouring. It is usually made in a cylindrical shape.

This cheese is complemented with a chilled glass of sweet dessert wine or ruby port.

Its production in Europe is regulated under Protected designation of origin laws, having PDO status, and can only be made in and around Buxton, from milk originating in Derbyshire, Nottinghamshire or Staffordshire.

== See also ==
- List of British cheeses
