= Beecher's Handmade Cheese =

Artisan cheesemaker and retail shop

- Type: Private
- Industry: Cheese
- Founded: 2003
- Headquarters: Seattle, Washington, United States of America
- Owner: Kurt Beecher Dammeier
- Website: beechershandmadecheese.com

Beecher's Handmade Cheese is an artisan cheesemaker with retail locations in the greater Seattle area and several airports. The company was founded by Kurt Beecher Dammeier in 2003 and opened in Pike Place Market after Dammeier acquired a difficult-to-obtain storefront lease in the Market. Because Dammeier had never been a cheesemaker, he sought out the assistance of Brad Sinko, who helped run a family cheesemaking business in Oregon. A second location was opened in 2011 Manhattan's Flatiron District; this closed in October, 2022.

Unlike most artisan cheese makers, Beecher's mainly uses pasteurized milk and operates a high-volume modern production facility, with multiple farms supplying milk. When Beecher's encountered problems in guaranteeing the standard flavor of the milks they were using to make cheese, the company bought their own herds of dairy cattle and farms to ensure control of the cheese products from beginning to end. Beecher's uses various cheese cultures when mixing cheeses, so a cheddar cheese produced by Beecher's may use cultures not normally intended for cheddar cheese production.

Beecher's Pike Place Market cheesemaking facility includes a café, which serves grilled cheese and other items, and a retail shop, which sells both Beecher's cheeses and others brands from local Pacific Northwest cheesemakers. The New York location is a much larger space. In addition to the production facility, café, and retail space, it also has a full-service restaurant downstairs referred to as The Cellar. Beecher's also manufactures and sells macaroni and cheese dishes (and other frozen sides), which have received praise in reviews from the national news media. Dammeier and his firm's cheeses have been featured on national television, including twice on The Martha Stewart Show and once on Oprah, with the "World's Best" Macaroni and Cheese featured as one of Oprah's "Favorite Things." A cookbook by Dammeier, Pure Flavor: 125 Fresh All-American Recipes From The Pacific Northwest, has been published, and incorporates recipes used to make various Beecher's products and dishes. In addition to their various business endeavors, Beecher's sponsors the Flagship foundation and Pure Food Kids project, an educational program to teach children in the Seattle public schools system about healthful diets.

== Founding and history ==
Before founding Beecher's, Dammeier had never made cheese, and had little direct knowledge of the cheesemaking business. His self-described "passion" for cheese began during his childhood in Tacoma, Washington, where his family always kept a cheese board piled high with local cheeses. Raised in a family business involving printing and food manufacturing, he decided to open a cheese business after his family sold the printing company. He named it for his great-grandfather, Beecher McKenzie. Dammeier also owns the Seattle-based specialty grocer Pasta & Co. and is a major investor in Pyramid Breweries; other members of his family have stakes in Pyramid as well. Dammeier also founded Bennett's Pure Food Bistro on nearby Mercer Island, and the food truck Maximus/Minimus, both of which carry many dishes prepared with Beecher's products. In 2003, Dammeier opened Beecher's in Seattle's Pike Place Market when a rare large retail location became available in the market after the nursery Molbak's closed its Market location and moved to its current Woodinville, Washington property.

After taking a cheesemaking course at Washington State University, Dammeier decided he needed to hire someone to work with him as chief cheesemaker. He hired Brad Sinko, a microbiologist, who previously had managed his family cheese business of Bandon Cheese in Oregon, before it was acquired by the Tillamook County Creamery Association. According to Dammeier, the artisanal cheese market was underrepresented in Seattle and Washington, and he opened his business in part to encourage more cheese business to grow in the region. In 2000, Washington had nine licensed cheesemakers; this expanded to twenty-eight by 2007. Dammeier compared the growth he expects in artisan cheese to the United States' recent growth in sales of specialty beers:

If you said the word 'Porter' 20 years ago, no one in the U.S. would have had any idea you were talking about beer. Twenty years from now, people will know what a washed rind is.

Thanks to financing from Dammeier's other business ventures, Beecher's had the ability to build up their operations slowly, absorbing the costs of capitalization of the business while experimenting with their cheeses, including the time to age them. "The first vat," remarked Dammeier, "we threw away. The second vat was really good." As their work progressed, Sinko would adjust the formulas of their cheese processing, the cultures, and the enzymes involved, and increased the average aging time for their Flagship brand to 18 months. However, they only publicly claim 12 months of aging. In their first year of operation, Beecher's had no aged product of their own to sell, instead building up an inventory of 80,000 pounds (36,000 kg) of cheese. During that same time, their primary sales were of fresh cheese curds.

== Milk supplies ==
After their initial founding with one milk supplier, Beecher's production system has had to expand several times to include more suppliers. As of 2006, Beecher's was in the process of purchasing their own farms in Eastern Washington for additional milk production, which will also give them full control over their entire product's creation. The principal milk supplier is Green Acres Farm in Duvall, Washington, using only hormone-free and antibiotic-free milk. When consistent milk production first became a problem, Beecher's purchased a herd of 200 cows. The entire dairy herd at Green Acres Farm is owned by Beecher's, who leases them back to the farm. For the New York production, all Holstein and Jersey milk come directly from Dutch Hollow Farms in upstate New York.

To ensure a standardized flavor for the finished cheeses, and due to there being insufficient space in their facilities for milk separating systems, Sinko said he "went and standardized the herd." Their initial milk from Holstein cows was sweet, but lacked the fatty content and nuttiness of Jersey cow milk that was part of the product they wanted to create. They were able to eventually balance the two to their satisfaction. Dammeier has described the blend of Holstein and Jersey milk as a "50–50 mix". From each farm, all the milk supplied to Beecher's is from the same herd, to ensure that the flavor of each batch of milk they receive is consistent (based on the herd's diet and environment).

At times, Beecher's has encountered challenges in maintaining this uniform standard. For example, when flooding affected one farm, the cows there produced enzymes in their milk that helped their calves to fight off bacteria, but changed the flavor of the milk.

== Cheese and food manufacturing ==
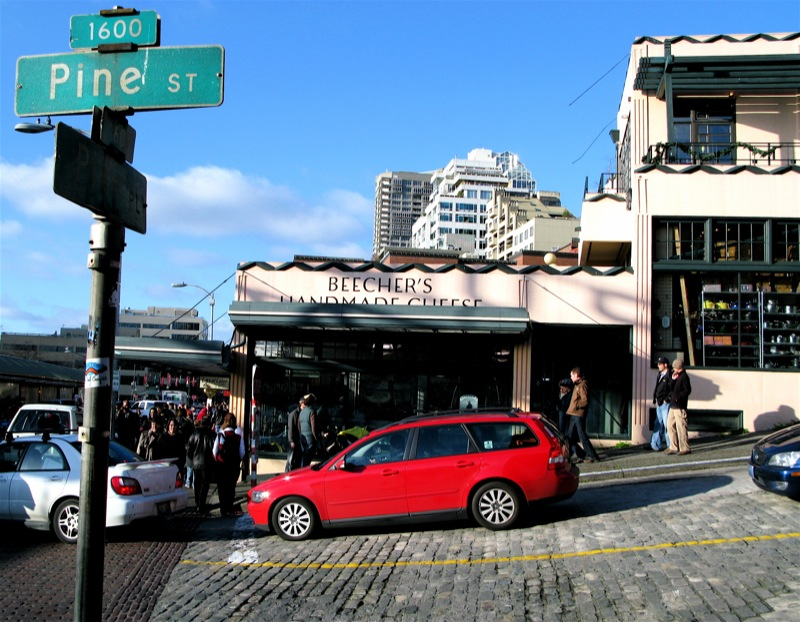
Beecher's Handmade Cheese facility in Seattle, Washington

The cheese factory is housed in a small, glass-walled facility in Pike Place Market, on Pike Place between Stewart Street and Pine Street. The location includes a retail shop and a café that features cheese-based meals. Passers-by in the heavily touristed market can watch the cheese making process. Beecher's produces over 500,000 pounds (230,000 kg) of cheese annually. Their manufacturing facility now operates twenty-four hours a day to keep up with their demand. The New York facility is significantly larger than Seattle's and can produce over three tons of cheese a day.

Sinko admits that the modern facility with large vats of cheese and milk processing would seem to contradict the word "Handmade" in the company name. According to him, all of the cheese is monitored, processed, and prepared by hand, but simply on a larger scale than most artisanal cheesemakers. Unlike most artisan cheeses, Beecher's is made largely with pasteurized milk. Dammeier believes that many people feel raw milk cheeses taste better due to renowned French cheeses, which were historically made of raw milk because the farms were unable to afford pasteurization. "I've probably tasted 150 different cheeses this year, and I'm convinced that raw milk doesn't create more flavor," he said, adding that his cheeses have a more consistent taste from not using raw milk. Nevertheless, Beecher's offers a raw milk version of their Flagship cheese. The cheeses they produce use no artificial ingredients or preservatives. Beecher's typically manufactures up to nine different varieties of cheeses each year, including a combination of their staple brands and various seasonal varieties.

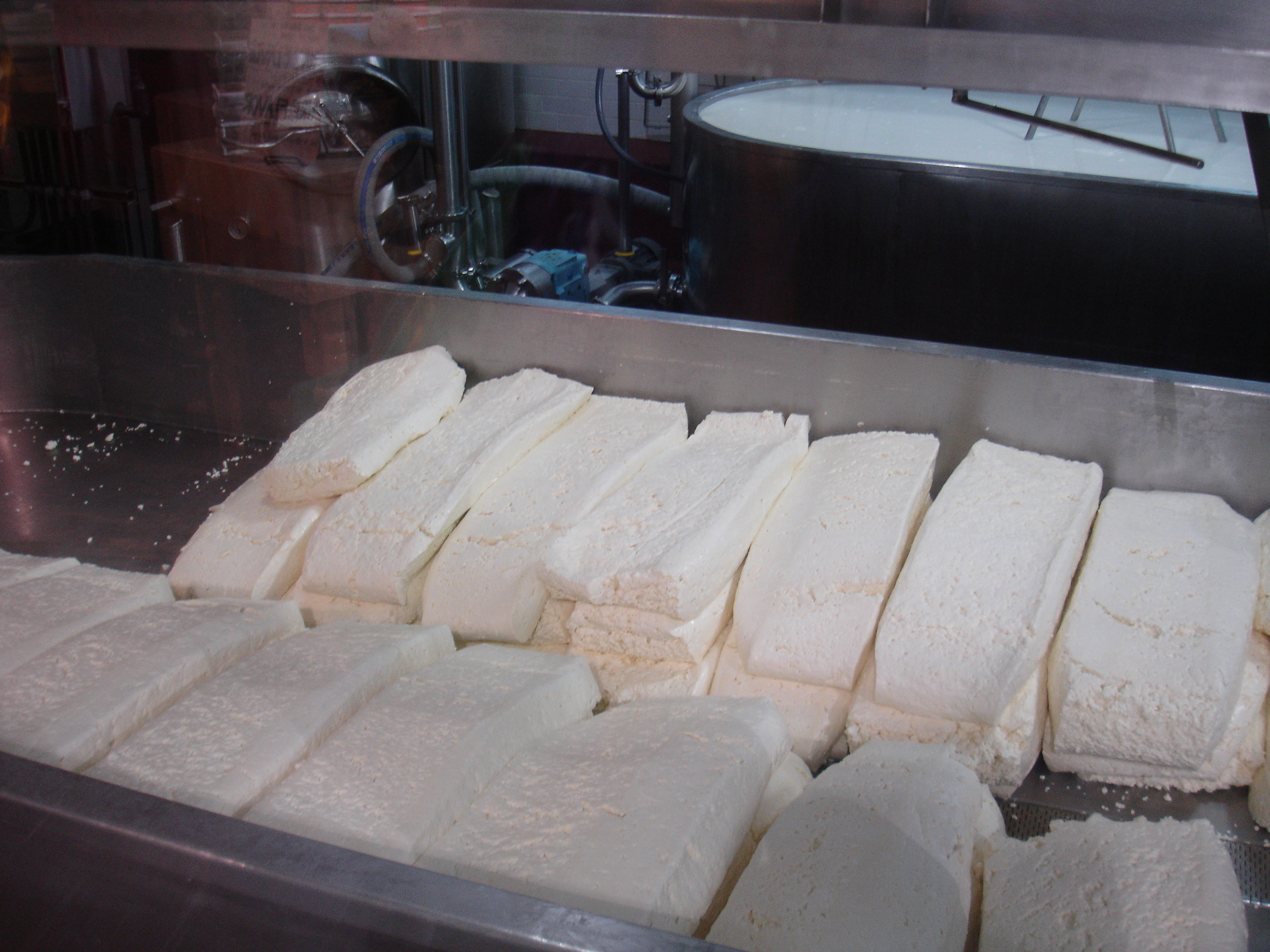
Cheese being prepared at Beecher's Handmade Cheese

At the Beecher's facility, their process for cheese manufacturing is multi-staged. Thousands of gallons of milk are hose-fed from delivery trucks into the manufacturing area, where it is heated to complete the pasteurization of the milk. The heated milk is processed into a stainless steel trough, and the temperature further increased, while the first live cheese cultures and rennet, a coagulant, are added to the developing mixture. According to Amir Rosenblatt, a cheesemaker at Beecher's, the heating and cheese temperatures used in their cooking process are tightly controlled through the sustainable technology of steam power. "A variation of half a degree [in the pasteurization process] can change the flavor of the cheese," he said. Cheesemakers use stainless steel "rakes" to then gather the milk mixture, before allowing it to settle briefly, at which point the cheese is cut repeatedly by hand until it achieves a yogurt-like texture and substance. This process is repeated often, until a desired consistency is reached. The mixture is then drawn away to a new trough where most of the remaining water and whey is drained from the cheese. While the whey is continually pulled from the cheese, cheesemakers constantly separate the cheese by hand into smaller and small stacks of cheese curds, which form as the whey is removed. To complete the curding, a large amount of salt is added to cure the cheese and draw still more whey from it. The curds are finally cut into portions, filled into cheese molds, stacked on top of each other, and the remaining excess moisture is forced from the cheese with a constant 60 pounds (27 kg) of pressure for at least 24 hours, before the finished cheese is stored to age. For every 10 pounds (10 kilograms) of milk and whey, Beecher's will typically create 1 pound (1 kilogram) of finished cheese.

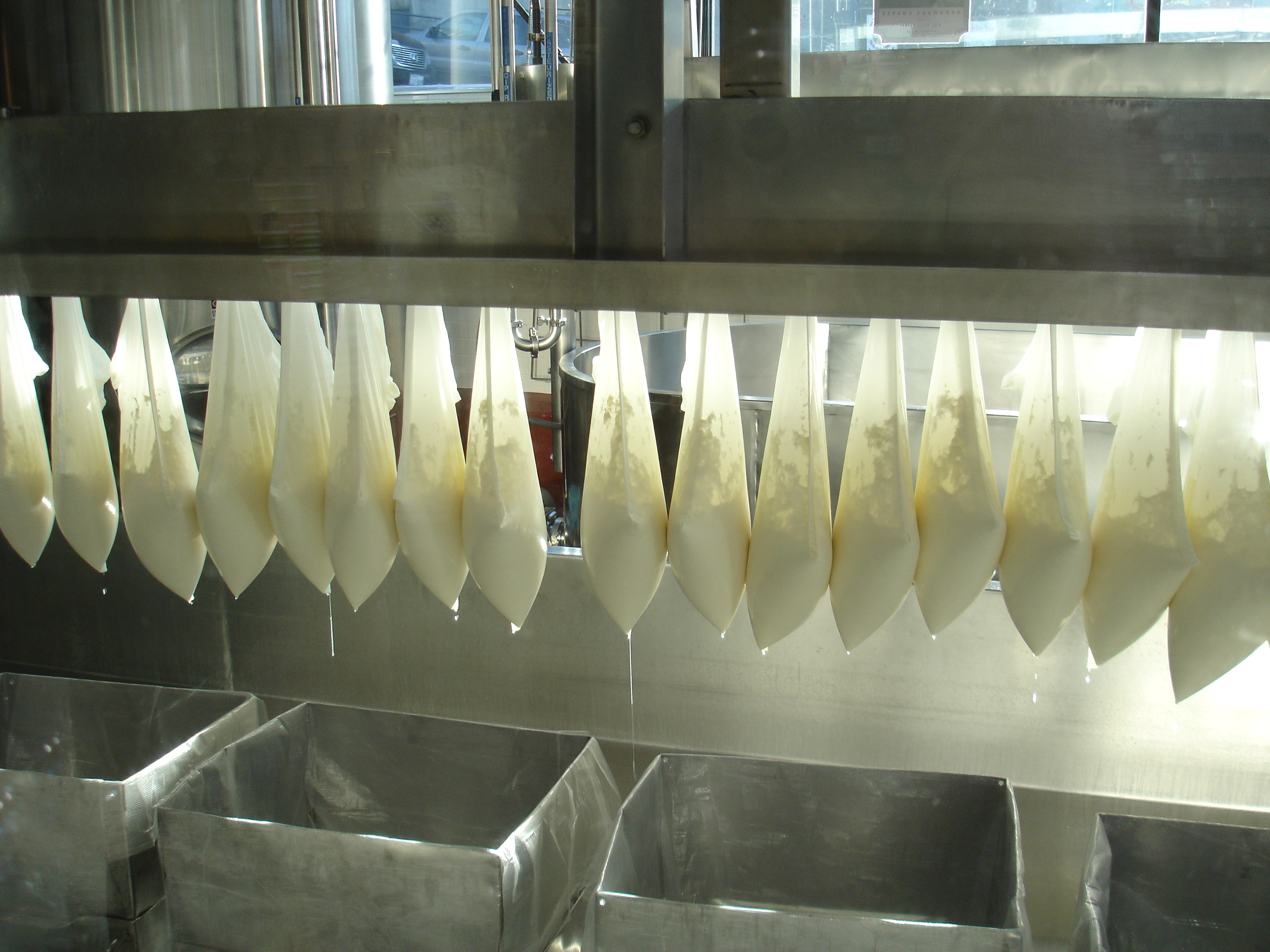
Cheese being drained of moisture at Beecher's Handmade Cheese

Beecher's cheeses differ from similar cheeses in that they mix cheese growth cultures in unusual ways. For example, their signature "Flagship" cheese includes cultures typically used for non-cheddar cheeses, such as Gruyère and Emmental, changing the nature, flavor, and texture of their cheddar. Flagship cheese is produced using a cheddaring process, but owing to a different taste, Beecher's does not call this cheese cheddar. The cheese has been described as having a "sweet finish and creamy texture" unlike the tangier cheddars, owing to this being one of the cheeses they create with a mixture of different cheese cultures. After being prepared in 40 pounds (18 kg) blocks and aged for approximately one year, the Flagship—unlike cheddars—lacks a rind, is moister, resembles butter visually, and carries a milky aroma due to being aged in plastic bags. A variant called "Flagship Reserve" is aged in cheesecloth in 18 pounds (8.2 kg) sizes on racks in open air, and is rubbed with butter while being turned daily. This preparation method causes the Reserve to lose up to 12% of its initial weight by the time it is completed. The Reserve is aged for a shorter amount of time, leading to a sharper, nuttier taste and texture, according to Food & Wine Magazine. Of the 500,000 pounds (230,000 kg) of cheese they produce annually, approximately 200,000 pounds (91,000 kg) will be Flagship, and only 15,000 pounds (6,800 kg) will be Flagship Reserve.

Additionally, Beecher's is in the process of developing new types of crackers, designed to not overpower the taste of the cheese with which they are paired.

== Retail sales and cheese shop ==
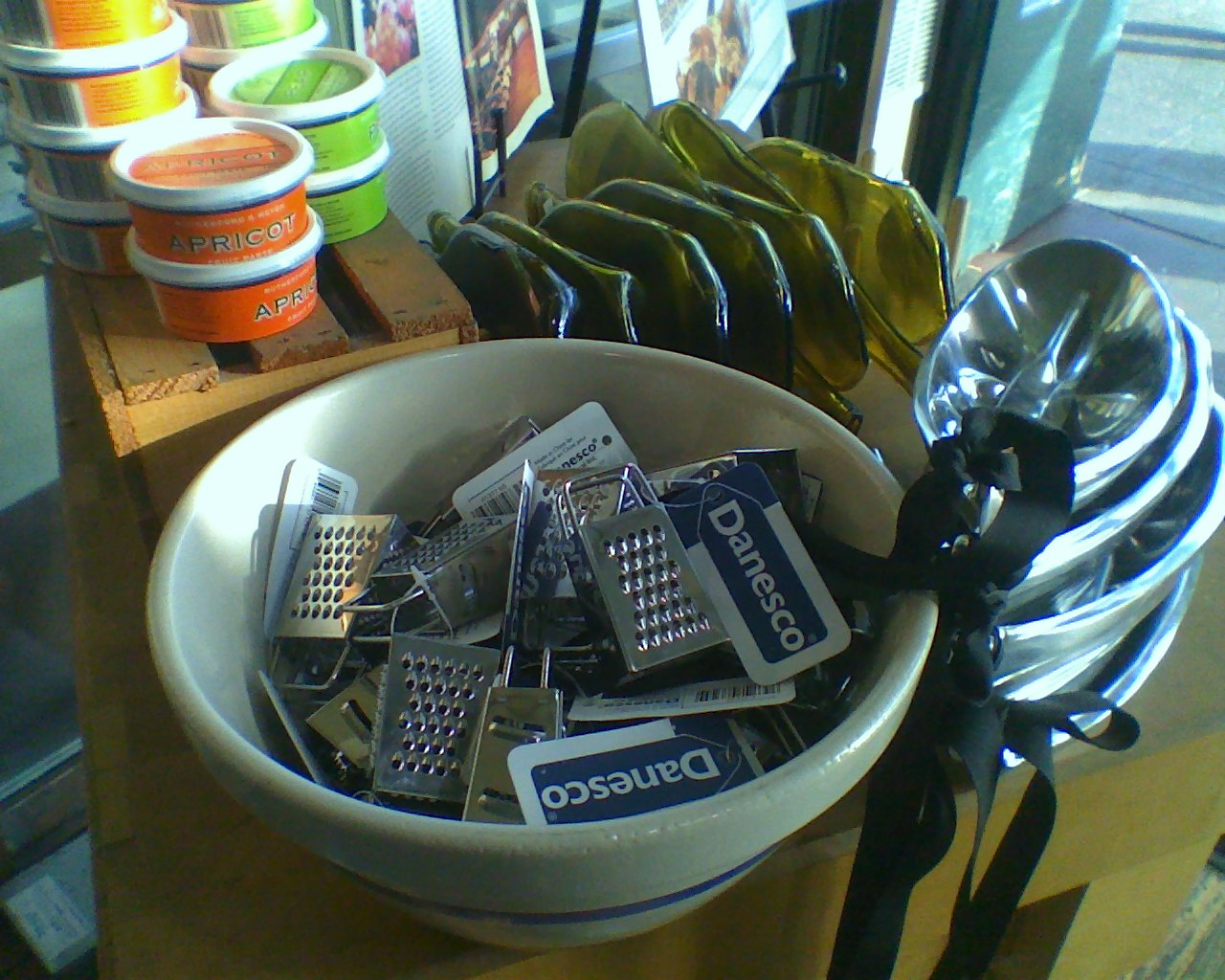
Products at Beecher's Handmade Cheese retail shop in Seattle

Beecher's features a gourmet cheese shop and café in their Pike Place Market facility. It is considered an anchor of the Pike Place Market, and has become a tourist attraction in its own right. During the day, crowds typically gather in the store, watching through windows as the cheesemakers prepare batches of cheese.

A portion of the cheese curds used in the manufacturing process is set aside to sell directly to visitors at the retail store. The principal cheeses created and sold by Beecher's are their Flagship and Flagship Reserve varieties; "Just Jack", a form of Monterey Jack cheese; "Blank Slate", a type of cream cheese; unpasteurized, raw-milk versions of their Flagship cheeses, and different cheeses seasoned and flavored with spices and herbs. Some of their seasonal varieties have included cheeses similar to Brie.

The Pike Place Market store now sells roughly thirty-five other local artisan cheese brands, in addition to the various Beecher's products. The Pike Place Market location also offers classes to the public about cheese making, cheese history, and the pairing of wine with cheese. The collection of Pacific Northwest cheeses on sale at the retail store has been described as the best in the entire region by Will O'Donnell in Northwest Magazine. In keeping with Dammeier's idea that his cheese business should encourage the growth of the artisan cheese businesses in the area, the Beecher's retail store makes special efforts to feature and sell cheeses from new and small Northwest cheesemakers.

Beecher's also has other locations in the Puget Sound region, including a store at the Bellevue Square shopping center, Seattle–Tacoma International Airport, and Paine Field in Everett. The company's locations accept mobile ordering through its own app.

Beecher's products are sold in retail stores throughout the country at well-known artisanal cheese vendors such as the shops of Murray Klein and the international Artisanal Cheese retail company. Beecher's also uses the services of PeriShip to ensure their products arrive to customers across the United States.

== Macaroni and cheese ==
Beecher's retail shop in the Pike Place Market sells over 17,000 orders of Dammeier's macaroni and cheese dish annually. The recipe is featured in a 2007 cookbook, Pure Flavor: 125 Fresh All-American Recipes From The Pacific Northwest, which Dammeier wrote with Laura Holmes Haddad. Both The New York Times and The Washington Post gave it reviews described as "rave", according to MSNBC news. Dammeier says the key to the success of their macaroni and cheese is to undercook the pasta by half, so that it softens from cheese sauces in baking with a béchamel sauce. The recipe, named simply "World's Best Mac & Cheese", has been prepared by Dammeier during guest appearances on several television programs. On August 19, 2008, Beecher's facility and cheese was featured on The Martha Stewart Show, and Dammeier prepared his macaroni and cheese dish with Stewart on the program. The "World's Best Mac & Cheese" was also featured as one of Oprah's "Favorite Things," and a second time on "The Martha Stewart Show."

== Awards and recognition ==
In 2007, Beecher's was the winner of the American Cheese Society awards for their cheddar cheese. At the World Cheese Awards in 2007, Beecher's "Marco Polo" cheese won a gold medal, and at the American Cheesemaker Awards in Newport Beach, California, they took first place, also in 2007. Beecher's also came in as the runner up for Best In Show at the 2007 World Cheese Society competition, in a field of 1,207 competitors. Beecher's again won a top award from the American Cheese Society for their Marco Polo cheese in 2008. According to Laura Werlin, author of The New American Cheese: Profiles of America's Great Cheesemakers, their Flagship cheese is "everything a cheddar should be - and more."

== Pure Food Kids ==
Beecher's and Dammeier also fund and develop "Pure Food Kids: A Recipe for Healthy Eating", an outreach and educational program, run by the Pure Food Kids Foundation, for elementary and middle-school children in the Seattle Public Schools, with the goal of teaching children about healthful foods and eating habits. The program was initially developed by Dammeier and his wife Leslie, after they learned about and were unhappy with the state of school cafeteria meals in Seattle, where their three children attended public school. Established in 2005, 1% of the total sales for Beecher's and Dammeier's other business, Bennet's Pure Food, Maximus/Minimus, and Pasta & Co., are used to fund the Pure Food Kids program. The Pure Food Kids program is staffed by trained volunteers, including Dammeier himself.

Fourth through sixth grade elementary school children are educated on the effects of food additives, eating healthful foods, reading food labels, and about marketing of food aimed at children. According to Chip Wood, co-founder of the Northeast Foundation for Children, fourth through sixth grade children will typically be between the ages of 9 and 12 years old. The program is provided at no cost to the children and their families. To date, over 15,000 children have participated in the educational program. Pure Food Kids is taught in classrooms, after-school events, and at Parent-Teacher Association events, with all supplies and materials provided by Beecher's, although there is explicitly no promotion or use of any products from any of Dammeier's businesses.

== See also ==
- Cougar Gold, a sharp cheddar made at Washington State University
- List of cheesemakers
- List of restaurants in Pike Place Market

== Sources ==
- Kurt Beecher, Dammeier; Laura Holmes Haddad (July 31, 2007). Pure Flavor: 125 Fresh All-American Recipes from the Pacific Northwest. Clarkson Potter. ISBN 978-0-307-34642-1.
