= Marble cheese =

Cheese type characterized by streaks of different colors

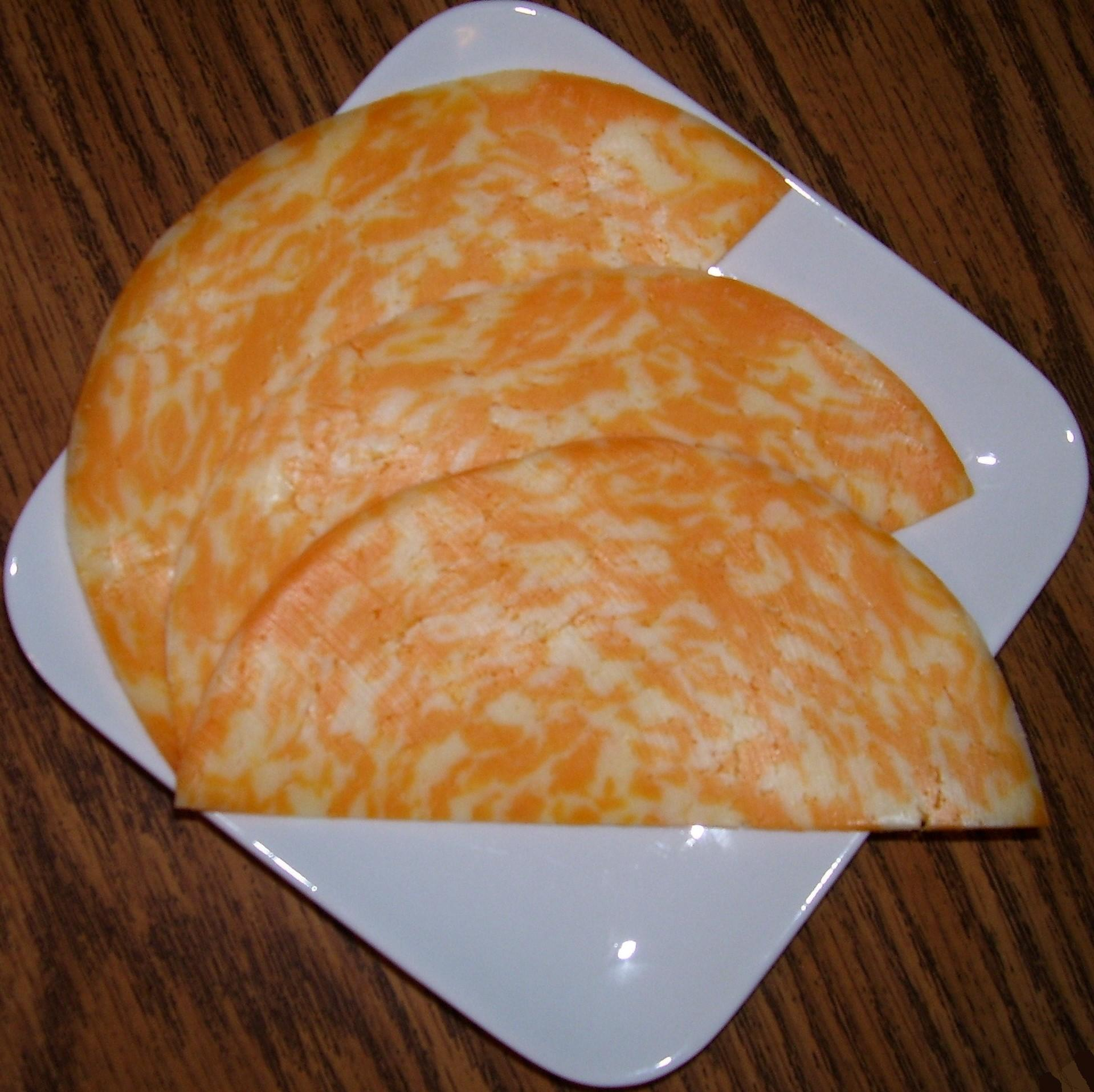
Colby-Jack, a common type of marbled cheese

Marble cheese is a name given to cheeses with marbled patterns. These are produced by combining either two different colored curds, cheese curds or processed cheeses.

== Description ==
Marble cheeses originate from the United Kingdom. They are usually hard, processed cow's milk cheeses. Colby-Jack which combines Colby cheese and Monterey Jack is most popular in the United States.

Others are produced from a combination of the curds of white and orange cheddars (for Marbled Cheddar), or similar. The marbling is usually not achieved with artificial additives, though cheeses such as Red Windsor and Sage Derby may contain colourings such as Chlorophyll (E140) and Carmine (E120).

=== Types ===
- Marble cheddar, a blend of white and orange cheddar.
- Colby-Jack, a blend of Colby cheese and Monterey Jack.
- Red Windsor, cheddar cheese with added red wine (usually Port or Bordeaux), or with a red food colouring.
- Sage Derby, a Derby cheese traditionally made with added sage; now usually made using green plants such as spinach, parsley and marigold; or with green vegetable dye.

== See also ==
- List of cheeses
