= Colby cheese =

American semi-hard cheese

Colby
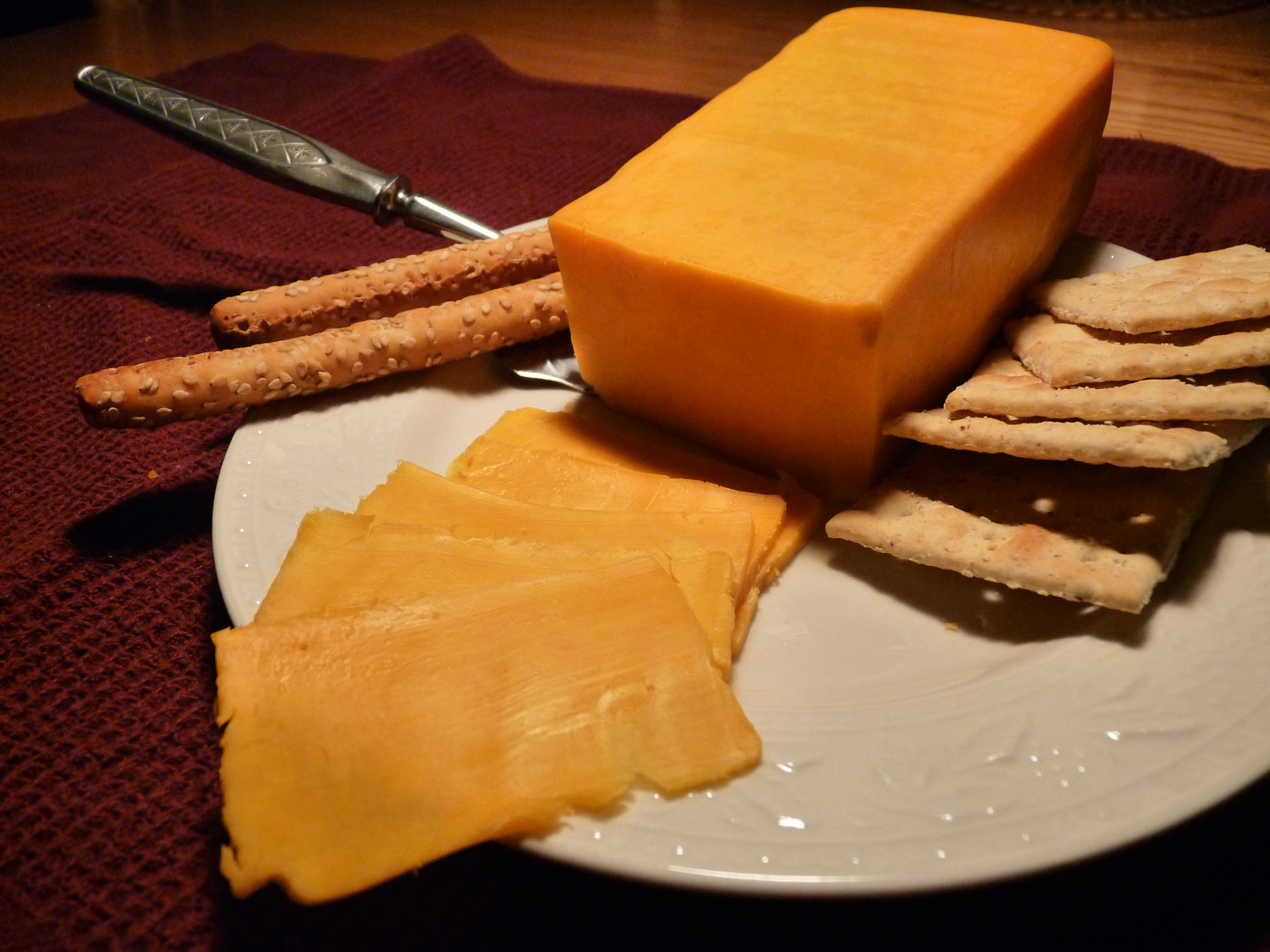
- Colby cheese
- Other names: Longhorn
- Country of origin: United States
- Town: Colby, Wisconsin
- Source of milk: Cows
- Pasteurised: Yes
- Texture: Semi-hard

Colby is a semihard orange cheese made from cow's milk. It is named after the U.S. city of Colby, Wisconsin, where it was first developed in 1885 and quickly became popular. Today the cheese is typically used in snacks, sandwiches, and salads.

Colby was developed by eliminating the cheddaring process used in making cheddar cheese, and instead partially draining the whey after the curd is cooked and adding cold water to decrease the mixture's temperature; the result is a moister and softer cheese. Traditional "washed-curd" Colby is pressed into a cylindrical form called a longhorn, and cures into an open texture with irregular holes.

Derivatives include Colby-Jack, a marble cheese produced by mixing Colby and Monterey Jack curds, and Pinconning cheese, a style of Colby that was developed in Michigan. The city of Colby considers the cheese an important part of its history, and organizes an annual festival to promote Colby cheese. Several proposals have been made in the Wisconsin state legislature to designate Colby the official state cheese.

== History ==
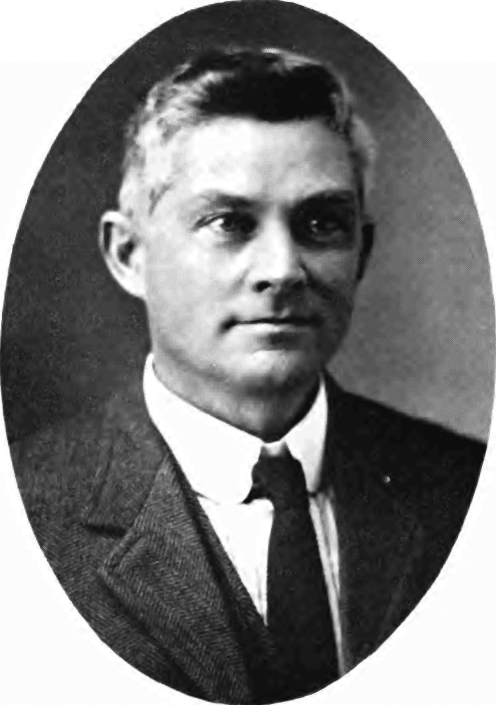
Joseph Steinwand c. 1918

In 1882, Ambrose and Susan Steinwand established a cheese factory near Colby, Wisconsin, on a 160-acre (65 ha) site they had purchased five years before. The Steinwands' son Joseph developed the cheese at the factory in 1885 when he was handling a batch of cheddar cheese and washed the curd with cold water. Accounts differ on whether the creation was intentional. According to some sources, Joseph had attended a cheesemaking course and was specifically interested in developing a new type of cheese; according to others, he neglected to drain the excess moisture after adding cold water and accidentally discovered the result. The resulting cheese, which was moister than cheddar, was named after the nearby city and quickly became popular because it did not involve the complicated cheddaring process.

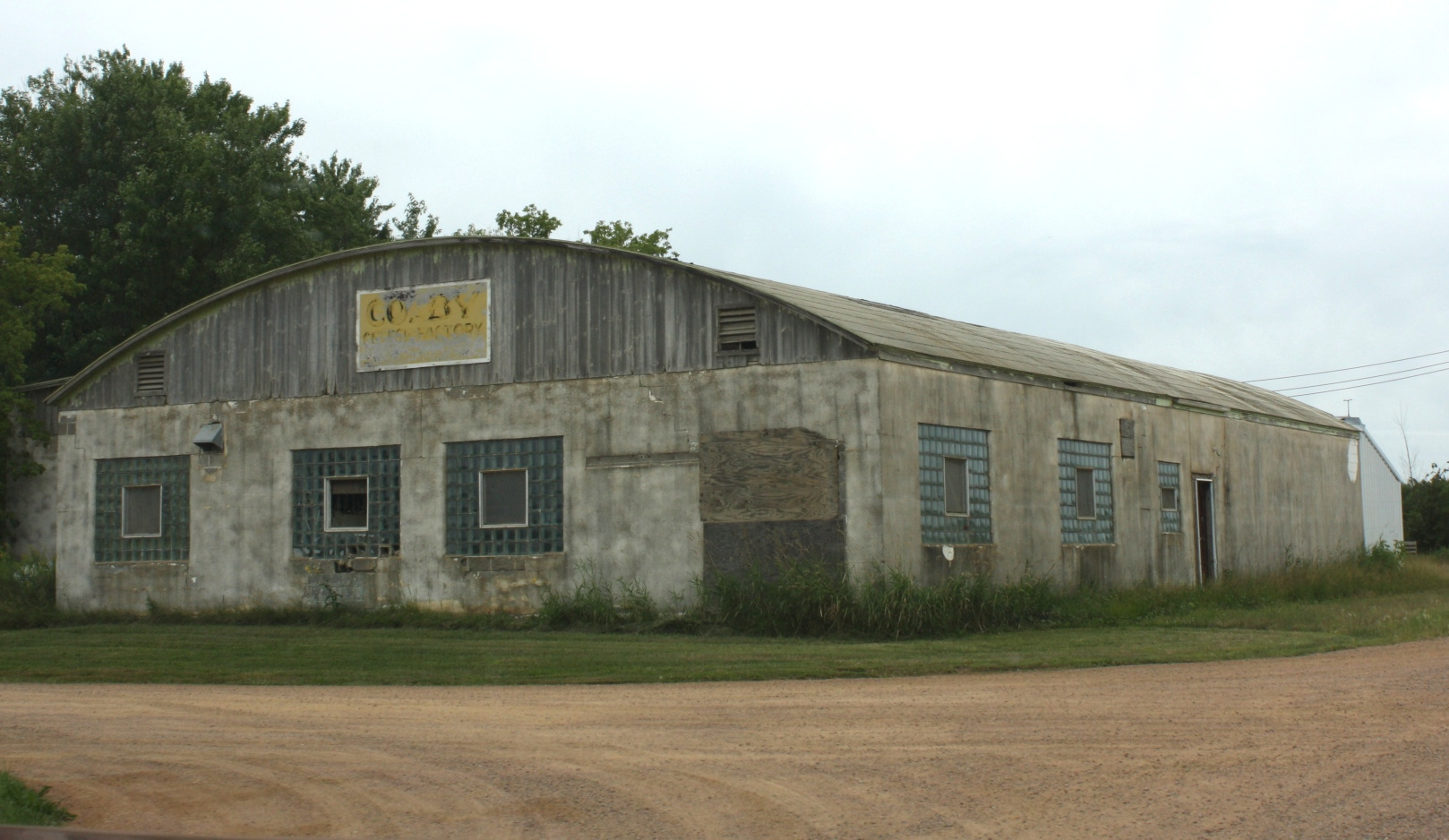
Colby Cheese Factory building built in 1965 on the site of the original Steinwand factory, closed in 1983 (photo 2012)

By 1896, the family was producing US$3000 worth of cheese each year. In 1898, the Colby Phonograph reported that "a merchant in Phillips gives as one of the 13 reasons why people should trade with him, that he sells the genuine Steinwand Colby Cheese." The city of Colby has organized an annual festival in July, "Colby Cheese Days", to promote the cheese since 1965. That same year, Lawrence Hoernke built a new Colby Cheese Factory on the site of the Steinwands' original factory; it produced about 4,000 lb (1,800 kg) of Colby a day until it shut down in 1983.

Several proposals have been put forth to make Colby the official state cheese of Wisconsin and to add the designation to the Wisconsin Blue Book published by the state government. In 1998, the city of Colby adopted a resolution supporting the measure and the Wisconsin State Assembly voted 81–15 in support, but the bill was not voted on by the Senate. A similar measure was introduced in 2019, but did not receive a vote in either the Assembly or the Senate. In 2021, the bill was introduced again in an Assembly committee, with Joseph Steinwand's great-granddaughter speaking in support of the measure. Supporters of the bill said that it commemorates Wisconsin's dairy history, while critics argued that a special designation for Colby could undermine the sales of other cheeses, including cheddar and mozzarella, that are also produced in the state.

== Production ==
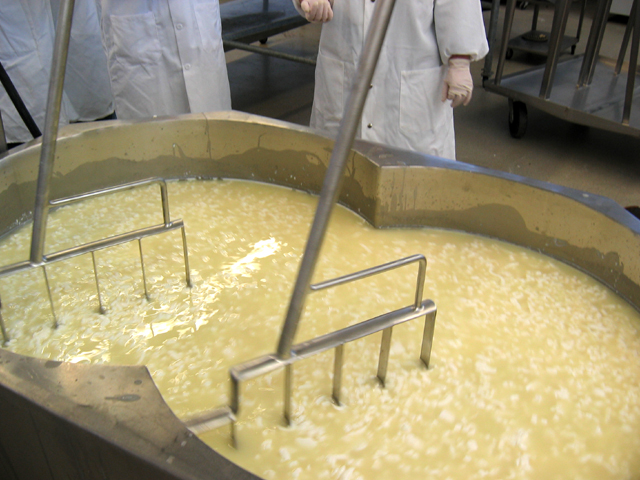
Cooking of curds in a cheese vat

The manufacturing process for Colby is similar to that of cheddar cheese, except that the mixture does not go through the cheddaring process. Cow's milk that has been standardized to a protein–fat ratio of 0.96 undergoes pasteurization and is stored at 88 °F (31 °C) while the starter Lactococcus lactis (subspecies lactis and/or cremoris) is added. After an hour, 2.4 US fl oz (70 ml) of annatto, a coloring agent, and 6.4 US fl oz (190 ml) of diluted rennet are added per 2,200 lb (1,000 kg) of milk. The mixture is left to set for 15 to 30 minutes. The curd is then cut and cooked at 102 °F (39 °C) until the pH of the whey is about 6.2 to 6.3.

Next, instead of draining all of the whey and cheddaring the remaining curds, only about two-thirds of the whey is drained until the curds break the surface. Cold water is added until the temperature of the mixture is about 81 °F (27 °C); increasing this temperature slightly produces a cheese that is less moist. After washing with the cold water for 15 minutes, the mixture is fully drained and salt is added to the curd. The curd is placed into molds that press it at 10 to 20 psi (69 to 138 kPa) for 16 to 18 hours. It is then packaged and ripened for 2 to 3 months at 37 to 39 °F (3 to 4 °C). This process produces 22 to 24 lb (10 to 11 kg) of cheese per 220 lb (100 kg) of milk. Monterey Jack has a similar manufacturing process, with the difference of allowing the curd to sit after draining the whey until it reaches a pH of 5.3. Colby is traditionally pressed into a cylindrical form that is 13 in (33 cm) long with a diameter of 3.9 to 5.9 in (10 to 15 cm). In this form, it is also known as a "longhorn". The cheese can also be pressed into a rectangular form with smaller rectangles or half-moon shapes cut from it.

In its annual report on the dairy industry, the United States Department of Agriculture (USDA) groups together "other American varieties" of cheese, including Colby, Monterey Jack, and other washed- and stirred-curd varieties. In 2020, the USDA reported that the United States produced 1.5 billion lb (0.68 billion kg) of these cheeses at 144 plants. Wisconsin was the leading state with 320 million lb (150 million kg) produced at 44 plants, and California produced 286 million lb (130 million kg) of cheese at 11 plants.

== Character ==
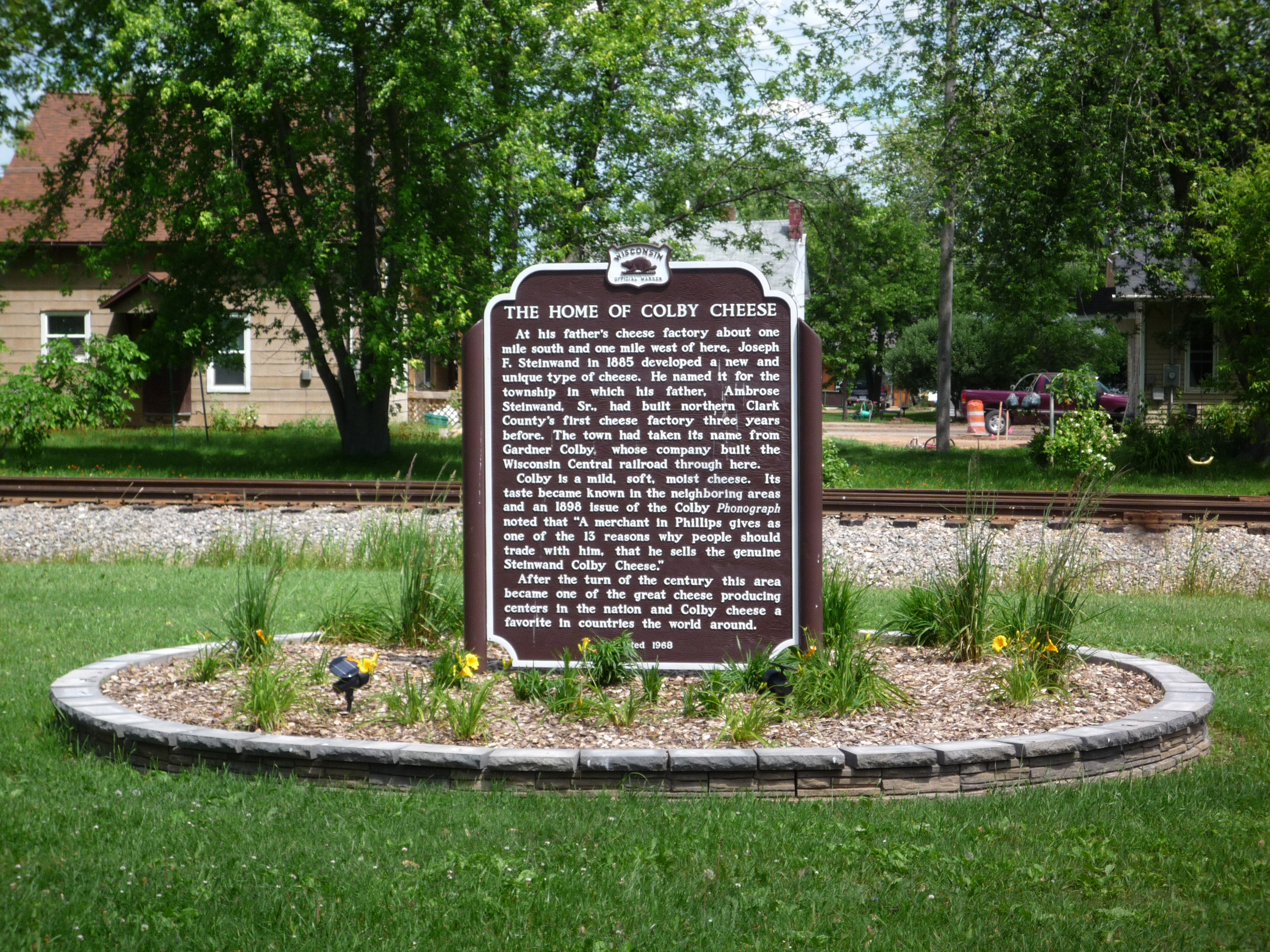
A marker in Colby, Wisconsin, describes Colby cheese as "a mild, soft, moist cheese".

Colby is a semihard cheese. Its washed-curd process produces a moister and softer texture than cheddar. The reduced acidity of the curd results in a mild and milky flavor, with its orange coloring derived from annatto. Compared to more crumbly cheeses such as an English Cheshire, Colby is relatively elastic because its whey is drained at a high pH. The standard of identity in the United States, according to Title 21 of the Code of Federal Regulations, dictates that Colby must have a moisture content of 40% or less and that the solids content must contain at least 50% milkfat, resulting in a minimum 30% total fat content of the cheese. In practice, the solids content is typically 52–53%, with a total fat content of 31–32%, and salt content of 1.5–1.8%. Compared to cheddar, the calcium content is slightly lower. Traditional Colby has an open texture with irregular holes. This aspect used to be required by its standard of identity in Wisconsin, but the requirement was removed due to vacuum packaging removing the holes from the cheese and creating a compact texture.

The higher moisture content of Colby compared to cheddar leads to a weak body and it does not keep its quality for as long. It often develops a bitter taste and becomes extremely soft after 100 days, and is typically recommended to be consumed within three months. Foodborne bacteria including Listeria monocytogenes, Staphylococcus aureus, and Salmonella species are less likely to grow in hard or semihard cheeses such as Colby, with a moisture content less than 50%.

== Uses and derivatives ==
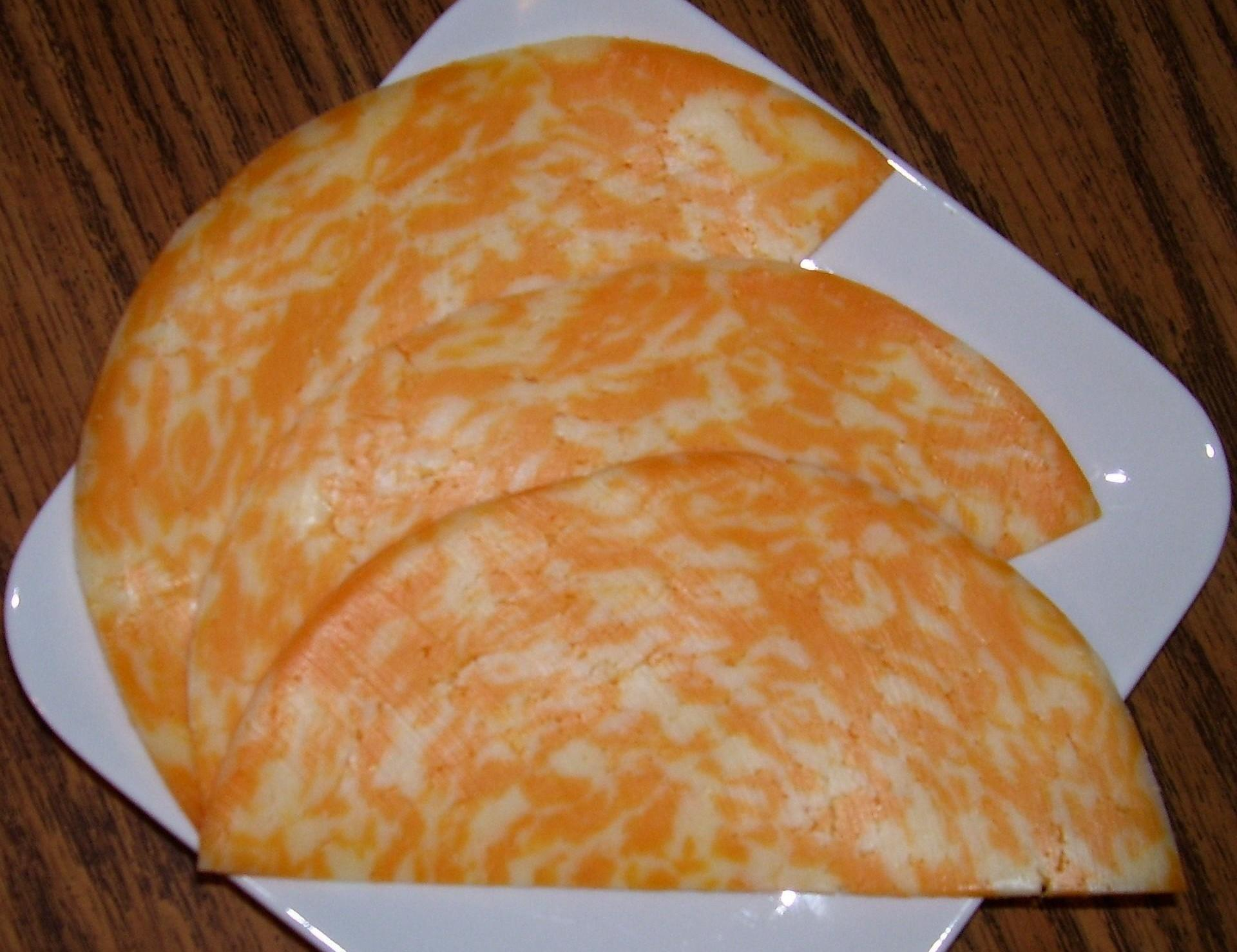
Slices of Colby-Jack

Because of its mild flavor, Colby is typically used as a table cheese and in snacks, sandwiches, and salads. It can also be grated and combined with other cheeses for use on pizza.

Colby is combined with Monterey Jack to produce a marble cheese known as "Colby-Jack", where the colored Colby and uncolored Monterey Jack curds are mixed before the pressing and ripening steps. It is more popular than either cheese sold individually, with estimated 2006 supermarket sales of 84 million lb (38 million kg).

Pinconning cheese is a style of Colby named after Pinconning, Michigan, where it was created in 1915 by Dan Horn, who had moved to the city from Wisconsin and found an excess of cows and milk in the city. Pinconning is aged variously, as long as 16 years.

== See also ==
- Cuisine of Wisconsin
- Wisconsin dairy industry
