= Monterey Jack (disambiguation) =

Monterey Jack is a type of cheese.

Monterey Jack may also refer to:

- Monterey Jack, a character from Chip 'n Dale Rescue Rangers
- Jack in the Box (restaurant), known as "Monterey Jack's" between 1985 and 1986
