= Elderberry wine =

Type of wine made from elderberries

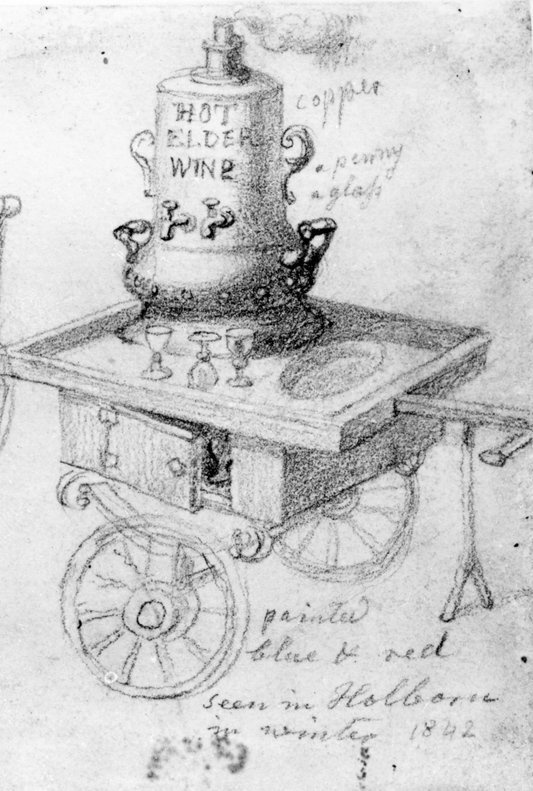
Hot Elder wine stall in Holborn, London in 1842

Elderberry wine is a type of wine made from elderberry (Sambucus sp.), by mashing the berries, adding yeast and syrup, and leaving for several months to ferment. Its color is a dark color between purple and black, and a strong flavor.

Elderberry wine has been drunk since antiquity. In For the first European settlers in America, elderberry plants were likely among the first that were turned into wine. Elderberry wine was still being drunk in the 19th century. Among the Quaker population of Pennsylvania, elderberry wine was credited with medical benefits in accordance with their outlook on temperance. Elizabeth Ellicott Lea includes a recipe in her mid-century cookbook, spiced with ginger and cloves, and recommends a sweetened, dilute portion of it to children afflicted with "the summer disease" (diarrhea).

Elderberry wine was popular in parts of England in the same century, at a time when it was credited with possessing healing properties. The 1800 edition of Hannah Glasse and Maria Wilson's The Complete Confectioner tells readers: "It is an excellent febrifuge, cleanses the blood of acidity, venom and putrefaction... it is good in measles, small-pox, swine-pox, and pestilential diseases; it contributes to rest, and takes away the heat that afflicts the brain." Glasse had included a recipe for "elderberry wine" in her 1747 The Art of Cookery Made Plain and Easy, but the actual recipe was for an elderberry syrup that could be added to raisin wine. Susannah Carter included a recipe in her 1802 book of household management and cookery The Frugal Housewife. As of the middle of the 19th century, vendors in London sold warm elderberry wine to laborers. At the end of the century, a warmed elderberry wine was the most popular Christmas drink in Surrey, and in Devon, large demand for the wine sustained a large elderberry industry. In the 1960s in England, elderberry wine was integrated into a cheese, forming the veins of Red Windsor. Elderberry wine continued to be drunk in the 1980s, and was typical of Cheshire, where it was served sparkling.

Elderberry wine continues to be made in small quantities by manufacturers, and by home winemakers. It is sometimes confused with elderflower wine, which are made with the plants flowers rather than berries, and has the appearance of a white rather than red wine. Elderberry wine is valued by adherants of Wicca, believing that drinking it gives one access to the fairy world.
