= 2120 (restaurant) =

Restaurant in Seattle, Washington, U.S.

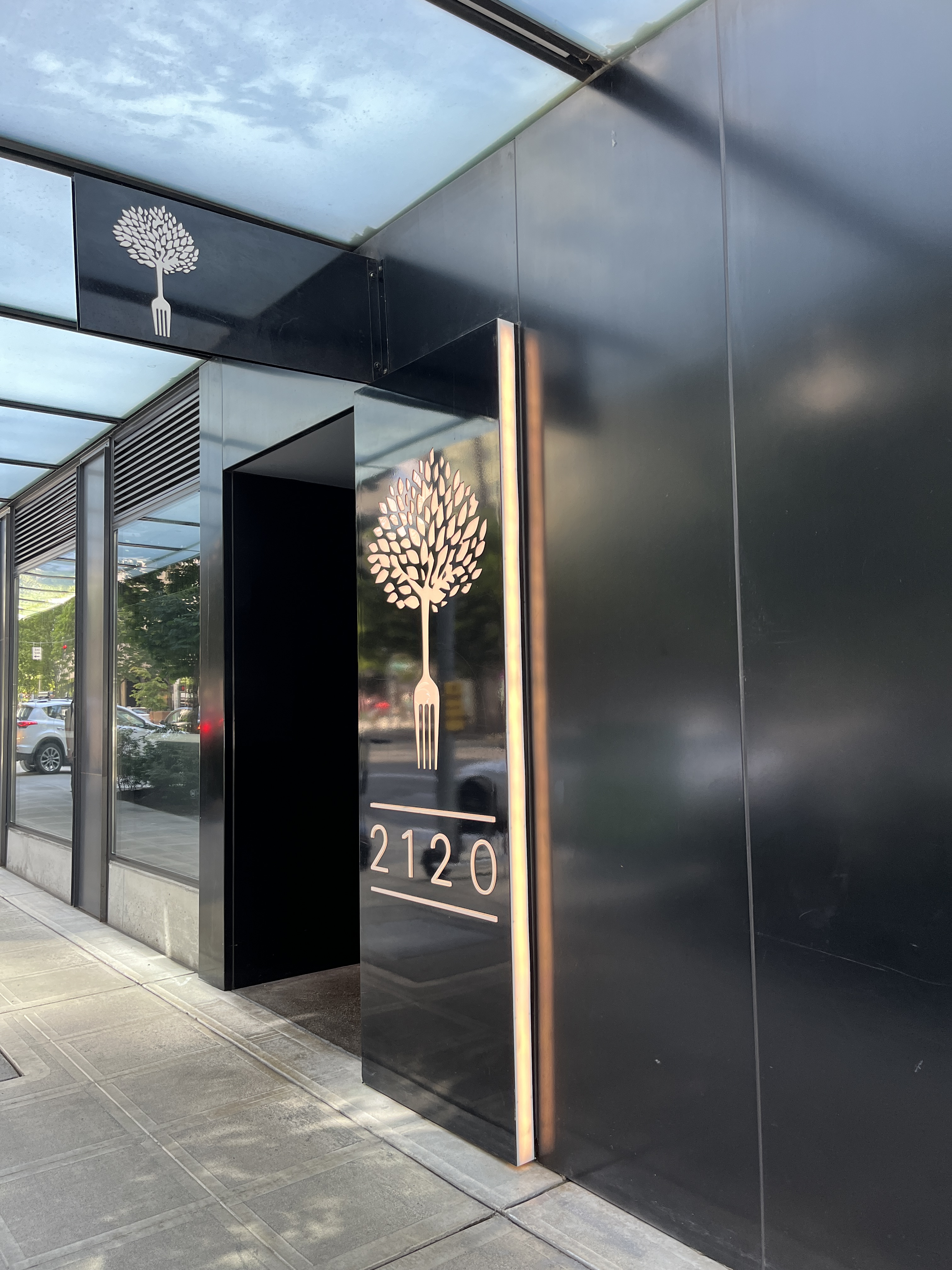
- The restaurant's exterior in 2024
- Interactive map of 2120

Restaurant information
- Owner: Milan Uzelac
- Chef: Derek Bugge (2017–2018); Rusty Cole (2018–present)
- Food type: American
- Location: 2120 6th Avenue, Seattle, King, Washington, 98121, United States
- Coordinates: 47.6157°N 122.3402°W
- Website: 2120restaurant.com

2120 is an American restaurant in Seattle, Washington. Owner Milan Uzelac opened the restaurant in Denny Triangle in 2017.

== Description ==
The American restaurant 2120 operates in Seattle's Denny Triangle, near the Amazon Spheres. Megan Hill of Eater Seattle has described the food as "Latin American-Northwest mash-up" that "[leans] heavily on Pacific Northwest-sourced produce, seafood, and meat". She has also said 2120 has "plenty of industrial moodiness". KING-TV has said the restaurant serves "artful, and detail oriented" food and has a "modern, yet cozy" atmosphere.

=== Menu ===
The menu has included chicken with mole negro, grilled octopus, lamb tartare, a Painted Hills strip steak with cilantro chimichurri, Chinook salmon with salsa verde, and masa dumplings. The deviled eggs have chapulines (toasted grasshoppers). The wagyu burger has manchego from Beecher's Handmade Cheese, as well as avocado, bacon, and chipotle. 2120 has also served macaroni and cheese with duck-fat croutons, bacalao cakes, chile rellenos, and migas.

Beer, cocktails, and wine are on the drink menu. The Gin Wabbit has carrot, egg whites, lemon, and vanilla, and the Sotol Sazerac had agave, fennel bitters, and sotol.

== History ==
Owner Milan Uzelac and chef Derek Bugge opened the restaurant on June 24, 2017. 2021 initially served lunch and dinner, later launching brunch on July 1. According to Eater Seattle, Bugge "infuses plates with influences from his native Seattle and from his mother’s Mexican roots".

Bugge left 2120 in January 2018. In February 2018, executive sous chef Rusty Cole became executive chef and junior sous chef Kyle Quinn became chef de cuisine. Christopher Saenz was the general manager and wine director as of 2019–2021.

In 2018, 2120 participated in the Choose to Include campaign, which raised funds and awareness for the Special Olympics ahead of the Special Olympics USA Games.

2120 has been described as a sibling restaurant of 99 Park in Bellevue, which closed in 2017.

== Reception ==
Megan Hill included 2120 in Eater Seattle's overview of the city's "most beautiful" new restaurants of 2017.
