= Colby-Jack =

American variety of cheese

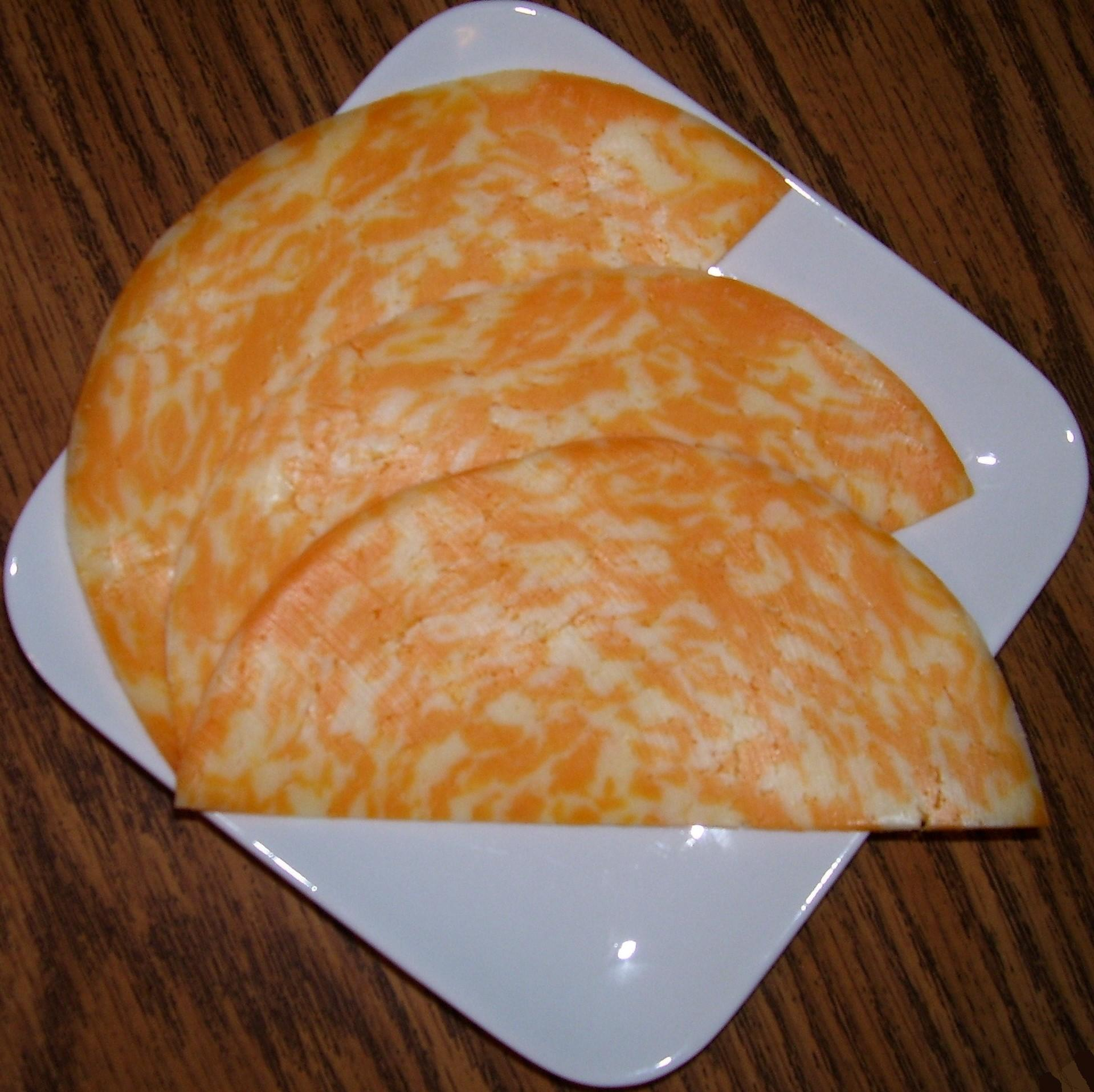
- Other names: Marble jack, Co-Jack, Cojack
- Country of origin: United States
- Source of milk: Cow
- Pasteurised: Yes
- Texture: Semi-hard
- Aging time: 14 days

Colby-Jack, or Co-jack/Cojack, is an American marble cheese made from Colby and Monterey Jack. It is classified as semi-hard in texture and is mild due to its two-week aging process. It is generally sold in a full-moon or a half-moon shape when it is young. The flavor of Colby-Jack is mild to mellow. Colby-Jack cheese is mainly produced in the states of Wisconsin and California. It is used in various dishes or as a topping to be melted. These dishes include burgers, pasta bakes, macaroni and cheese, and casseroles, among others.

== Origin ==
The name Colby-Jack comes from the combination of the names of the two kinds of cheese it is made from, Colby and Monterey Jack cheese. Colby cheese originates in Colby, Wisconsin, and was created by Joseph F. Steinwand in 1885. Monterey Jack cheese originates from Monterey, California, and was made by Mexican Franciscan Friars during the 1700s. Colby-Jack cheese was then processed by marbling the two kinds of cheese together. It was not made at a large scale until the 20th century, when the cheese became more popular and moved out of Wisconsin to larger areas of the United States (See Factory manufacturing). Before it was made on a large scale, the small, wooden building in Wisconsin only made 57 kg (126 lb) of cheese each day. At this time, Colby-Jack was pressed into a 5.8 kg (13 lb) long-horn shape and dipped in wax.

== Ingredients and preparation ==
=== Ingredients ===
Colby-Jack is a marble cheese that is a mixture of Colby and Monterey Jack cheeses. Colby-Jack is a semi-soft American cheese that is made from pasteurised milk. Annatto is the source of the orange color in the Colby component of Colby-Jack. The flavor of Colby-Jack is determined by the individual cheeses that are used to make it.

=== Sodium content ===
The baseline amount of sodium in 2009 of Colby-Jack was 668 mg of sodium to 100 g of cheese. By 2014 Colby-Jack was down to 600 mg to 100 g of cheese.

=== Preparation ===
Colby and Monterey Jack cheeses are individually prepared by mixing pasteurized milk and bacterial cultures. Once fully mixed, a coagulant is added, which makes the cheese mixture thicken and take on a gel-like consistency; the addition of coagulant also serves to separate the cheese curds and whey. Annatto is added during the preparation of Colby to give it its trademark orange color. Once ingredients have been mixed, the mixtures are drained of their whey, and high-quality curds of each cheese are selected from the remaining solid product. Chosen curds of both cheeses are then blended together, yielding a marbling of orange and white. The blended cheese is then shaped (frequently into a semicircular or rectangular block) or shredded. In some instances, the cheese may be dipped in wax for further preservation; this is subject to manufacturer preference.

==== Aging process ====
Most semi-soft cheese such as Colby-Jack while aging should be stored at 40°F to 45°F (4-7°C), wrapped in parchment or wax paper then again in plastic wrap. The aging process may last up to 14 days kept in a monitored environment to age. The aging process allows the cheese to fully set as well as completely combine its components and flavor.

== Factory manufacturing ==
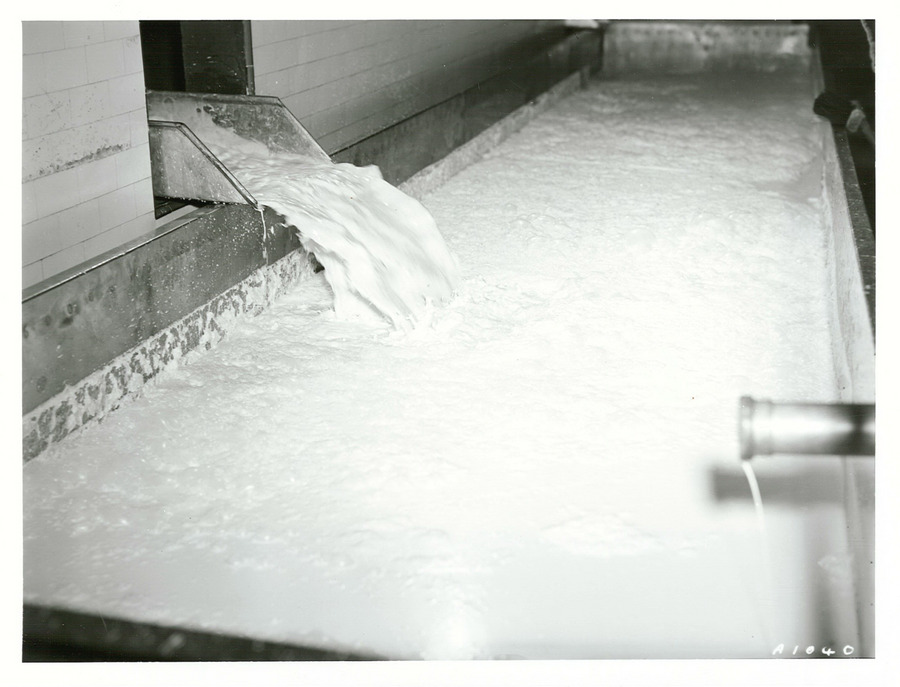
An example of cheese manufacturing machine, similar to what Colby-Jack is made in

=== Manufacturing ===
The manufacturing of Colby-Jack can be split into two types of manufacturing, wholesale and industrial purposes. The preparation for Colby-Jack remains the same but is made at a larger scale. Due to the large volumes of cheese that is made in the factories, robots are used to make the process easier for large quantities. In particular, large cheese manufacturer Wirtz states, "To support this market need for customised product, we have to push our automation as far as we can, and make it do things that it was not designed to do". This automation is important as it makes the process easier with the many variations of Colby-Jack that companies need to produce. Once this process is completed, robots are again used to package the cheese and prepare it for packing and distribution.

=== Packing and distribution ===
The Colby-Jack is packaged and distributed through the utilisation of robotics. These robots pick the cheese from a conveyor belt and pack them into cases ready to be distributed. These robots are flexible and are able to carry 0.03125 to 20 pounds of packaged cheese. This enables the production sequence to be more efficient and pack more into the packages ready for distribution. Before being distributed a randomly selected pack of Colby-Jack is chosen for quality control. Once this has been done, the cheese is ready to be shipped across the US and overseas depending on the manufacturer.

=== Packaging ===
As Colby-Jack is made in different forms, packaging varies for each form of the cheese. The types of packaging that Colby-Jack might be packaged in include:

- Vacuum packing
- Paraffin wax
- Latex emulsion (plastic coating)

There are many factors that should be considered when selecting the type of packaging. According to the journal Cheese Problems Solved, these factors include "permeability to water vapor, oxygen, NH_{3}, CO_{2}, and light, potential for migration of compounds from food to packaging or vice versa, and practical considerations, including suitability for labelling and compatibility with conditions during distribution and sale". This packaging will also depend on the manufacturer and is up to their discretion to decide what is best for their product.

== Popularity ==
Colby-Jack is both used in cooking and eaten by itself. Many dishes that commonly use Colby-Jack are American or Mexican in origin. Colby-Jack's mild flavor can make it easy to incorporate into a recipe.

Traditionally popular American and British cheeses, such as Colby-Jack, cheddar, Monterey Jack, and Colby, have seen a recent decline in popularity in the United States due to rising popularity of Italian-style cheeses, such as mozzarella.

In terms of sales, Colby-Jack is highly consumed in the United States. According to the USDA Data, "Per capita consumption of American-style natural cheeses such as cheddar, Colby and Jack cheeses rose from 11.7 pounds in 1995 to more than 15 pounds in 2017", indicating popularity in cheeses such as Colby-Jack.
