= Derby cheese =

English cheese

Derby
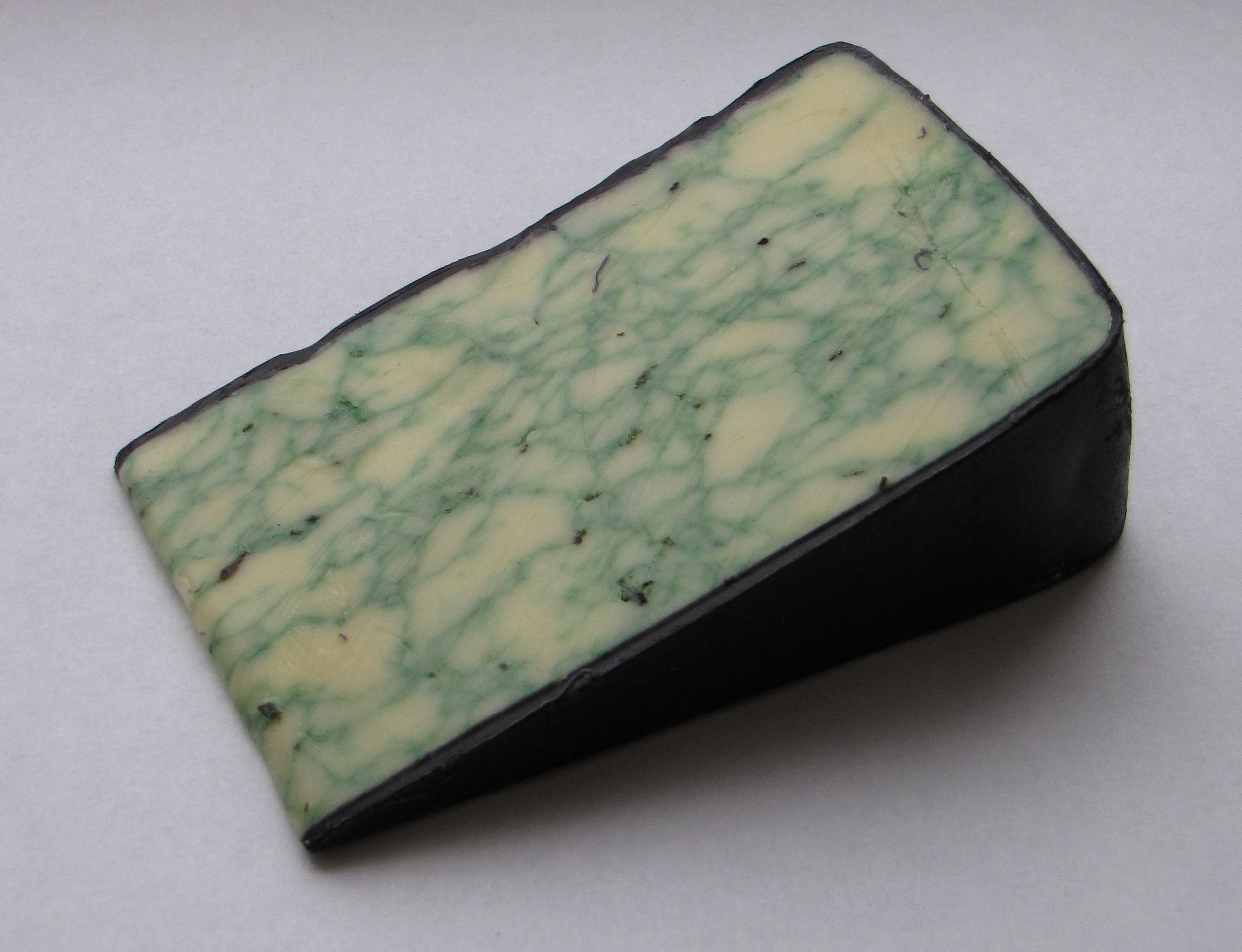
- Derby cheese varieties include Sage Derby, shown with wax coating

Derby cheese /ˈdɑːrbi/ is a mild, semi-firm British cow's milk cheese made in Derbyshire with a smooth, mellow texture and a buttery flavour. Like most of the traditional British hard cheeses it was produced exclusively on farms and was typically sold at a younger age than its more famous cousins Cheddar and Cheshire. It has a pale, golden orange interior with a natural or waxed rind and ripens at between one and six months. In many respects Derby is similar to Cheddar in taste and texture, but with a softer body (it doesn't go through the cheddaring process) and slightly higher moisture content. When young it is springy and mild but as it matures subtle sweet flavours develop and the texture becomes firmer.

Its claim to fame is that the first creamery in the UK was set up by a group of farmers in the village of Longford, Derbyshire – the farmers having agreed to pool their milk and have the cheese made on a larger scale using techniques that had been developed in the US.

== Varieties ==
The most common variety available is Sage Derby, a herb-flavoured Derby that has the traditional light ivory/yellow colour with blended light green areas of sage. Another common variety is port wine Derby, blended with port.
