= Red Windsor (cheese) =

Semi-hard English cheese

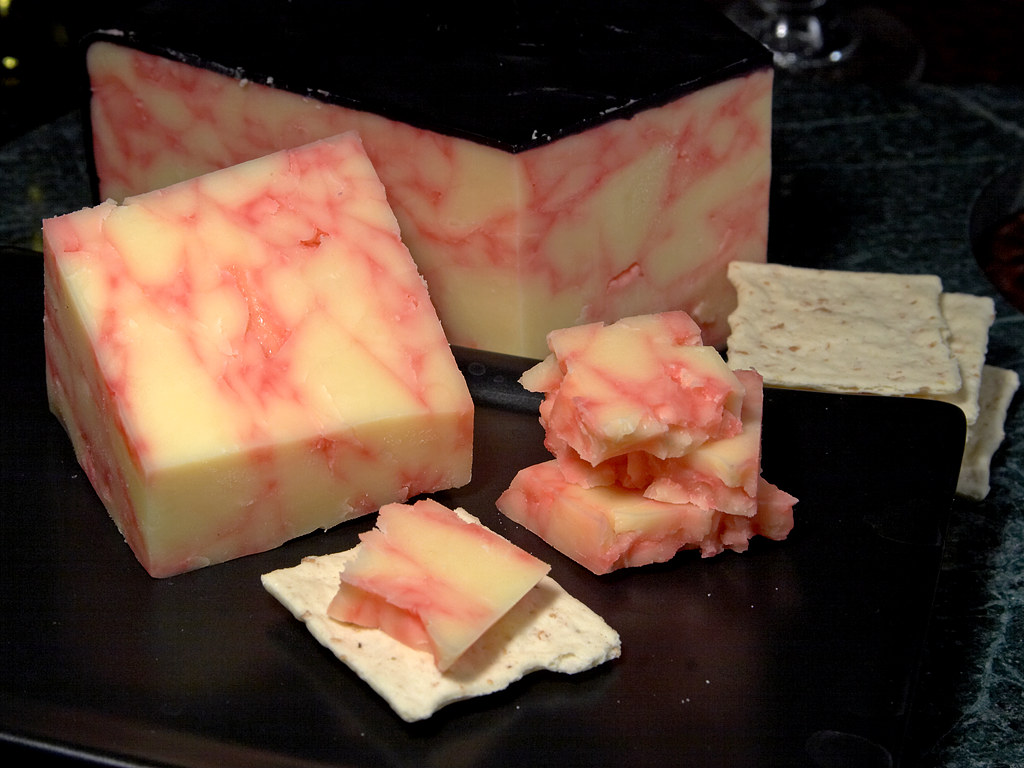
- Country of origin: United Kingdom
- Region: England
- Source of milk: Cows
- Texture: Semi-hard

Red Windsor is a pale cream English cheddar cheese from Leicestershire, made using pasteurised cow's milk marbled with a wine, often a Bordeaux wine or a blend of port wine and brandy.

It was first introduced to market in 1969.

Red Windsor is produced by Long Clawson Dairy, based in Long Clawson, Leicestershire.
