= PeriShip =

PeriShip Global
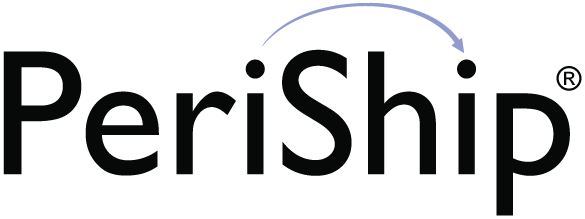
- Company type: Public
- Industry: Non-assets based third party logistics
- Founded: 2001
- Headquarters: Branford, Connecticut, United States
- Key people: Terry Oconnell VP Sales & Operations, Carlos Sandoval VP Technology
- Website: www.periship.com

PeriShip is a logistics provider for the perishable food industry. It was founded in 2001, and is based in Branford, Connecticut, United States. The company exclusively uses [UPS] for transportation. In 2022, PeriShip was acquired by Verifyme.

== History ==
In 2022, PeriShip was acquired by VerifyMe, a brand protection company in the United States.

== Services ==
PeriShip's purpose in this interaction is to decrease the time each party must spend on a transaction, which increases business productivity and decreases cost of the shipper and the transportation agency.

On the pre-transaction side, PeriShip places emphasis on proper packaging techniques to ensure integrity of perishable shipments. It also offers web services to both commercial and open-source shopping cart vendors which allows shippers to quote a PeriShip shipping rate to a customer before they buy.

During shipment, PeriShip processes data from UPS and interprets this data in the form of customized communication, such as regular emails, on the status of the package. It also monitors weather and flight conditions and reports on adverse conditions to the shipper.
