= Monterey Jack =

Kind of cheese

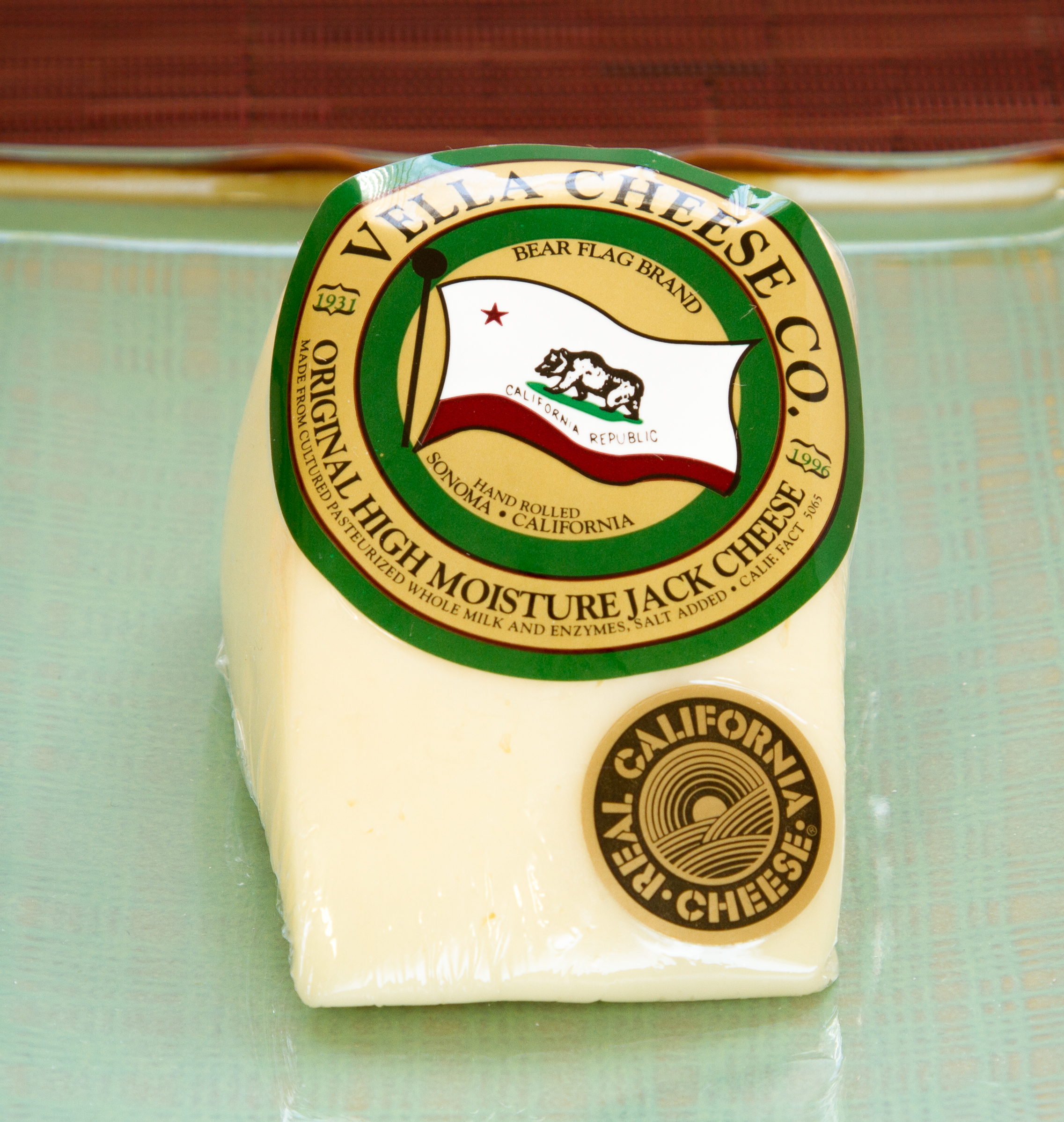
- Country of origin: United States
- Region: California
- Town: Monterey
- Source of milk: Cows
- Pasteurised: Yes
- Texture: Semihard, creamy
- Aging time: 1–6 months

Monterey Jack, sometimes shortened to Jack, is a Californian white, semi-hard cheese made using cow's milk, with a mild flavor and slight sweetness. Originating in Monterey, on the Central Coast of California, the cheese has been called "a vestige of Spanish rule in the early nineteenth century, deriving from a Franciscan monastic style of farmer's cheese".

In addition to being eaten by itself, it is frequently marbled with Colby to produce Colby-Jack, or with yellow cheddar to produce cheddar-Jack. Pepper Jack is a version flavored with chili peppers and herbs. Dry Jack is a harder cheese with a longer aging time.

== Origins ==
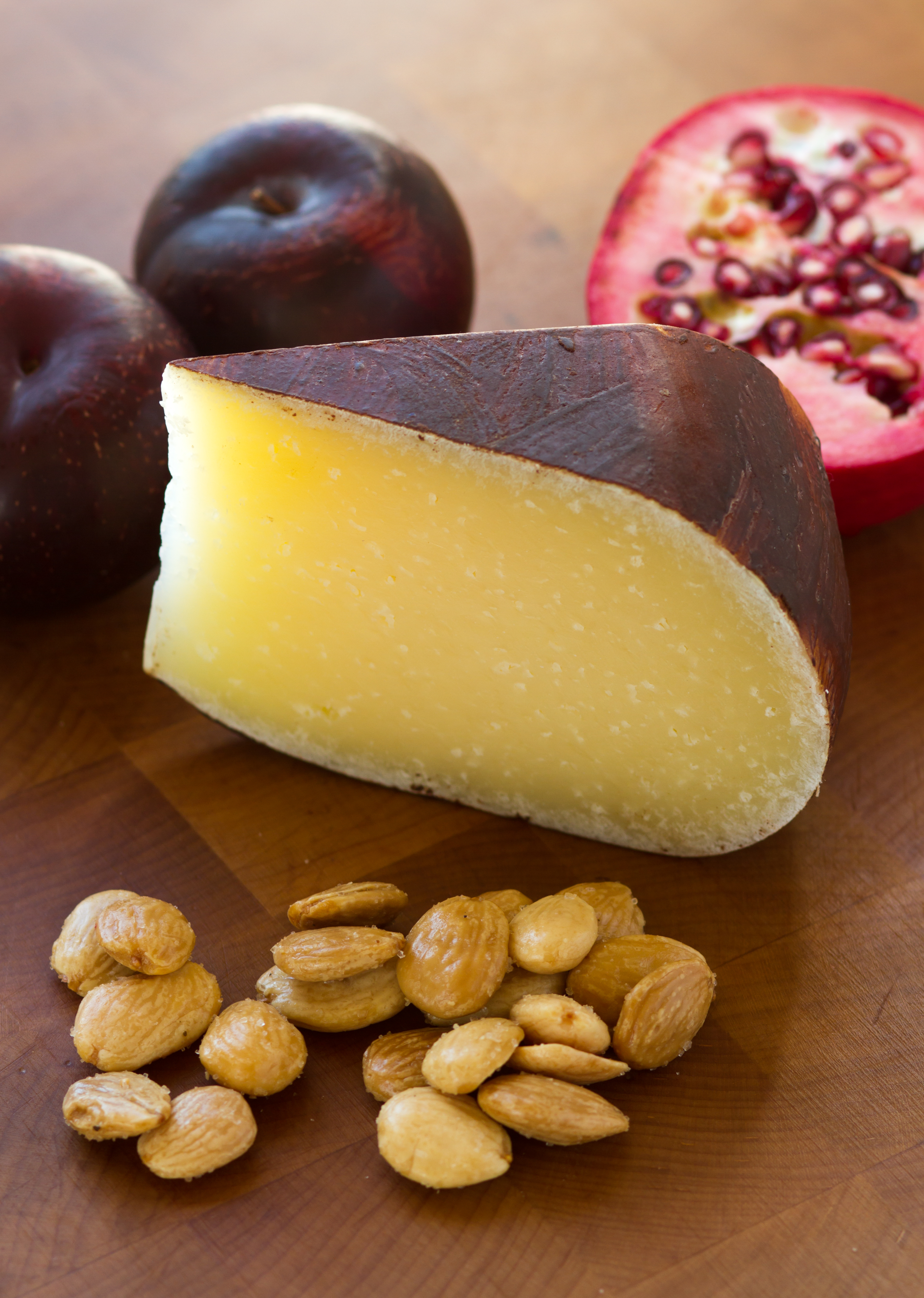
A wedge of dry aged Monterey Jack, known as Dry Jack

In its earliest form, Monterey Jack was made by 18th-century Franciscan friars of Monterey, Alta California.

In the 19th century, various individuals contributed to the production and commercialization of this cheese. Notably, Doña Juana Cota de Boronda began making and selling Queso del País (Spanish for "country cheese") in Monterey to support her family after her husband became incapacitated. She utilized a handmade jack to press the curds, which may have influenced the cheese's eventual name. California land speculator and businessman David Jacks sold the cheese commercially. He produced a mild white cheese that came to be known eponymously as "Jacks' Cheese" and eventually "Monterey Jack". Other ranchers in the area likewise produced the cheese, among them Andrew Molera, who built a successful dairy operation in Big Sur and whose Monterey Jack was especially well regarded.

== Aging ==
Although most of the softer varieties found in American supermarkets are aged for only one month, "Dry Jack" is a harder variety aged for up to 24 months.

== Uses ==
The cheese is commonly used as an interior melting cheese for quesadillas, California-style burritos, and also some Mexican-style burritos ("bean and cheese"). It can also be used on cheeseburgers or for grilled cheese sandwiches. It has a mild flavor and good melting quality for some pasta dishes.

== Variants ==
Dry Jack was created by accident in 1915, when a San Francisco wholesaler forgot about a number of wheels of fresh Jack he had stored. As World War I intensified and shipments of hard cheese from Europe were interrupted, he rediscovered the wheels, which had aged into a product his customers found to be a good substitute for classic hard cheeses like Parmesan.

Pepper Jack is a derivative of Monterey Jack flavored with spicy chili peppers, bell peppers, and herbs.

== Headache safety ==
Because of its low content of tyramine, an organic compound thought to be associated with headaches, Monterey Jack is frequently recommended as one of the few kinds of cheese that is safe to eat for migraine sufferers.

== See also ==
- List of cheeses
- Mahón cheese
- Mallorca cheese
