= Manufacture of cheddar cheese =

Cheesemaking process unique to cheddar cheese

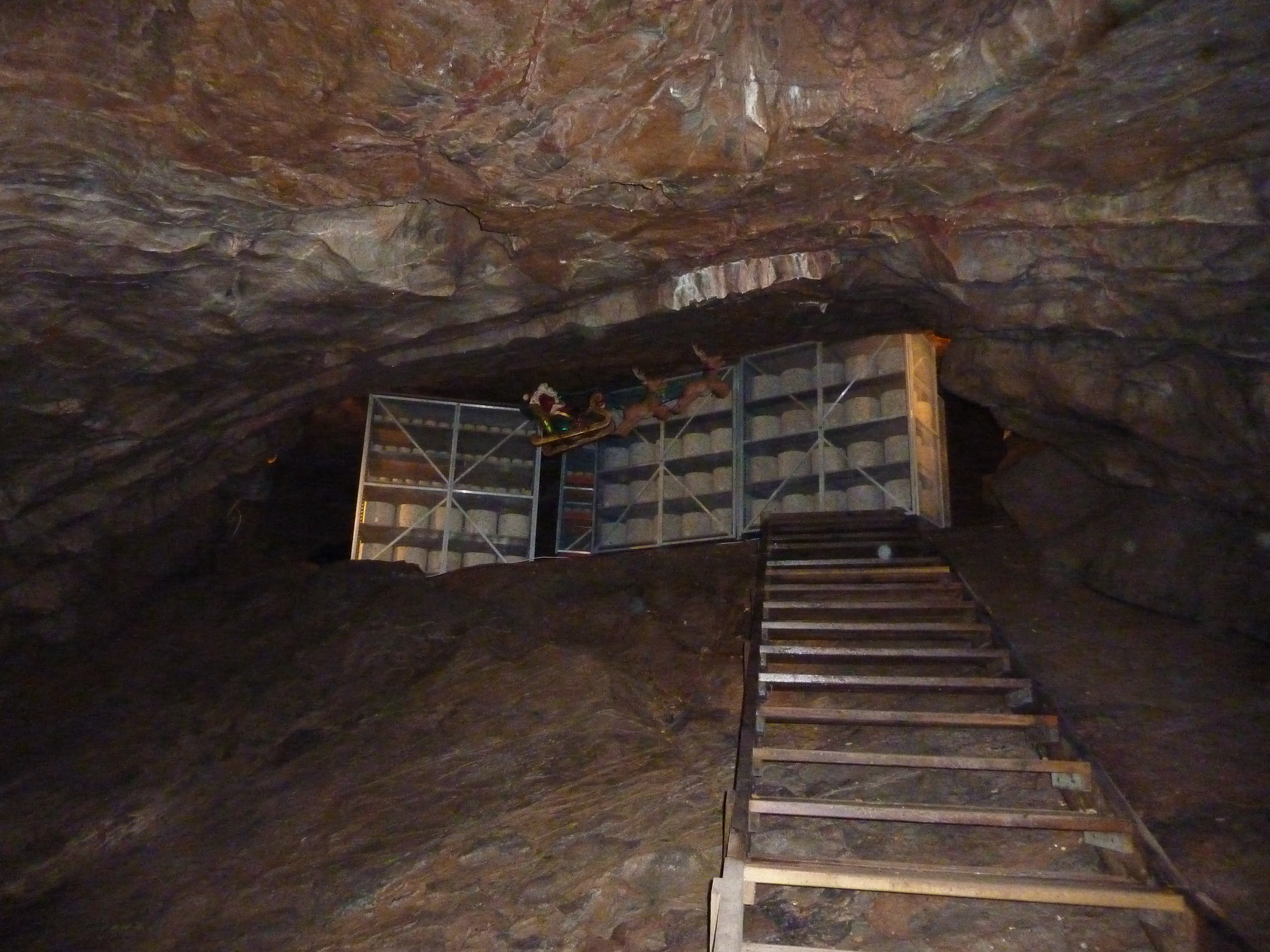
Cheddar cheese maturing in the caves of Cheddar Gorge, Somerset, England. The steady temperature and optimal humidity of the caves serve as a suitable environment for maturing the cheese.

The manufacture of Cheddar cheese includes the process of cheddaring, which contributes significantly to the unique flavour profile of the eponymous cheese, but is employed in the production of many related and inspired varieties, such as Red Leicester and Lincolnshire Poacher. Cheddar cheese is named for the village of Cheddar in Somerset in Southwest England where it was originally manufactured. The technique applied in the production of this cheese has since spread around the world and thus the name of its most significant component — cheddaring — has become generically known.

== Food ingredients used during manufacture ==
=== Milk ===
In general, the milk is raw milk (whole or 3.3%). The milk must be "ripened" before adding in the rennet. The term ripening means allowing the lactic acid bacteria (LAB) to turn lactose into lactic acid, which lowers the pH of the solution, greatly aiding in the coagulation of the milk. This is vital for the production of cheese curds that are later formed into cheddar.

=== Rennet/chymosin/rennin ===
Rennet is an enzyme, originally collected from the stomach of a milk-fed calf (natural rennet). This enzyme is responsible for the coagulation of the milk proteins to produce curds. Cheese produced this way is neither vegetarian nor kosher. Coagulation can also be achieved using acids, but this method yields lower-quality cheddar. The two key components of natural rennet are chymosin and bovine pepsin. Extracts from plants such as nettles were found to produce similar effects and have been used in some types of cheese-making (vegetable rennet).

When calf-rennet grew scarce in the 1960s, scientists developed a synthesized type of chymosin by fermenting certain bacteria or fungi (microbial rennet), but this was also not useful for all types of cheese-making. A solution using recombinant-gene (GMO microbial rennet) technology was developed and approved by the U.S. Food and Drug Administration in 1990. This splices the calf-gene for producing chymosin into the genes of certain bacteria, yeasts, or fungi, producing pure chymosin.

== Equipment ==
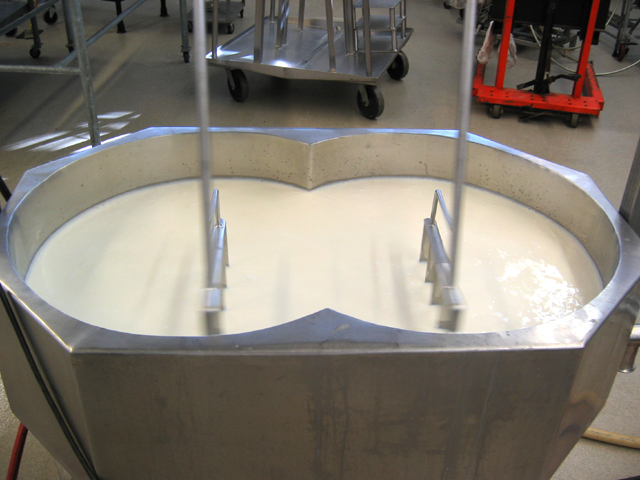
180 kg (400 lb) of milk in a pilot-scale cheese vat

Stainless steel knives are used to uniformly cut the curds at various points during the process. The device is a stainless steel frame with stainless steel wires, which cuts the curd cleanly. Vats will vary depending on a variety of factors, but in general are in the shape of an oval or rectangle with hollow walls, called the jacket, that are used for holding warm water to keep the curds at desired temperatures. A milling machine is used to cut the matted curds that are formed during the cheddaring process. This allows the curds to be easily salted.

== Process ==
=== Addition of rennet ===
In general, 85 to 115 g (3 to 4 oz) of rennet is added per 450 kg (1,000 lb) of mix. The rennet serves to coagulate the milk protein and form curds. The vat must be mixed thoroughly after the addition of the rennet to ensure equal mixing, and it also helps to dilute the rennet to make it easier to spread around.

Pure water is used when diluting the rennet, as any pH that is not near 7 will rapidly decrease the effectiveness of the rennet, as will chlorine.

=== Setting the curd ===
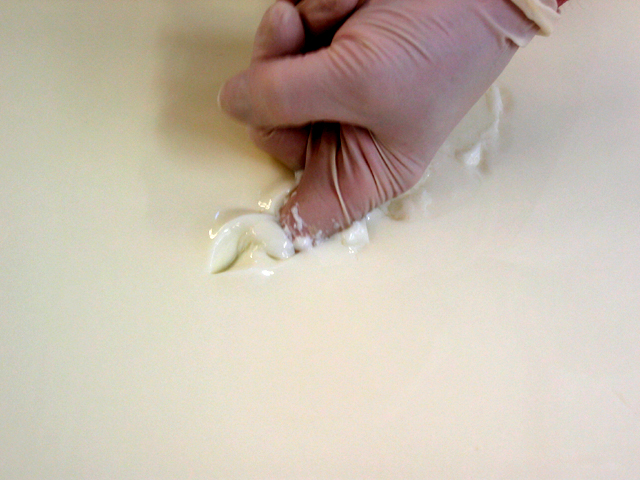
Testing of curd setting

Once the rennet is added, the mixture must be allowed to set and form curds. The mixture is kept at around 29 to 31 °C (84 to 88 °F). Temperature is controlled by flowing warm water through the jacket of the vat. Setting time varies, typically from 30 to 40 minutes.

The most common way to determine when the curd is set is by inserting a flat blade at a 45-degree angle into the curd and raising it slowly. If the curd breaks cleanly leaving a glassy fracture, it is ready for cutting. In a large Cheddar-manufacturing facility, this may also be tested using a viscometer.

=== Cutting the curd ===
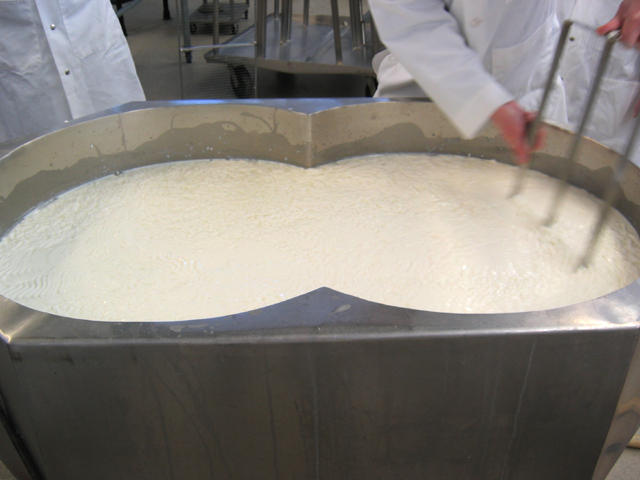
Cutting of the curds after setting

The curd is cut into 6-to-16-millimetre (1/4 to 5/8 in) cubes with stainless steel wire knives. A smaller cube size means the cheese will be lower in moisture, whereas a larger cube size will result in a high-moisture cheese.

It is important that cutting time be minimized and the cuts clean. The best way to determine how efficient the cutting job was is to determine the fat content of the whey. The optimal level of fat content of whey is 0.3% fat or less.

The curds are handled gently after cutting to prevent fat and protein loss to the whey. The curd is prevented from sticking to the sides of the vat, but minimal agitation is desired. The curds are allowed to set again for 10 to 15 minutes. Fat and protein loss may affect the ability of the cheese to be considered cheddar cheese, depending on the region where it is created (See Code of Federal Regulations for US standards)

=== Cooking the curd ===
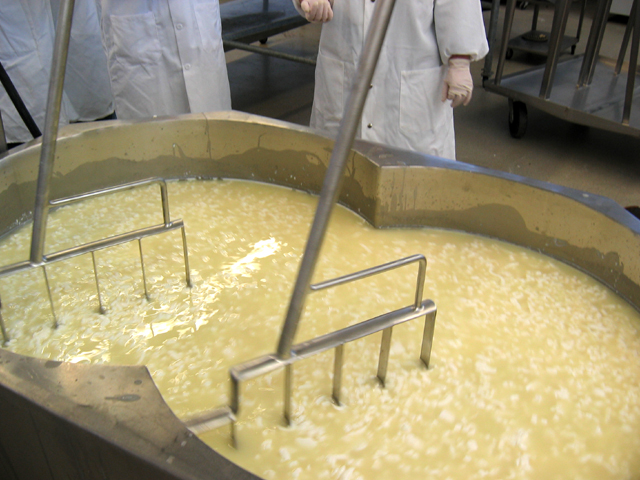
Cooking of curds, during the manufacture of cheddar cheese

The curd is cooked by the addition of hot water to the jacket of the vat (up to 39 °C or 102 °F). The curd is stirred constantly during this step to avoid uneven cooking or overcooking, and the cooking will take 20–60 minutes. The whey's pH will be around 6.1 to 6.4 by the end of the cooking.

=== Draining the curds ===
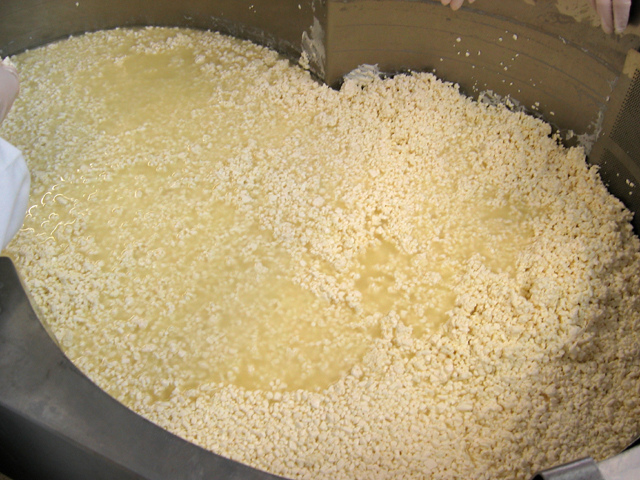
Draining of the whey; the screen is only partially visible here on the right.

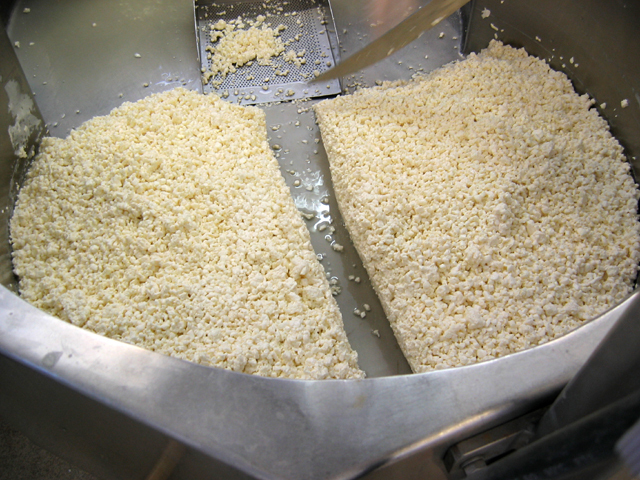
Initial piling of the curd; in this instance the curds were piled and allowed to sit before being cut and separated.

Whey is removed from the curds by being allowed to drain out of the vat. In general, a gate is present to prevent curds from escaping. When most of the whey is gone, the curds are raked to the sides of the vat, allowing whey to drain down the middle of the two piles.

=== Cheddaring ===
Cheddaring is a unique process in making cheddar cheese that involves stacking "loaves" of curd on top of one another in order to squeeze additional whey out of the loaves below. It is a multi-step process that reduces whey content, adjusts acidity, adds characteristic flavour, and results in a denser and sometimes crumbly texture.

==== Setting ====
The curds are allowed to set until they reach a pH of about 6.4.

==== Cutting loaves ====
"Loaves" of curds are cut about 15 centimetres (6 inches) wide along each side of the vat. After ten minutes, the loaves are turned over and stacking begins.

==== Stacking loaves ====
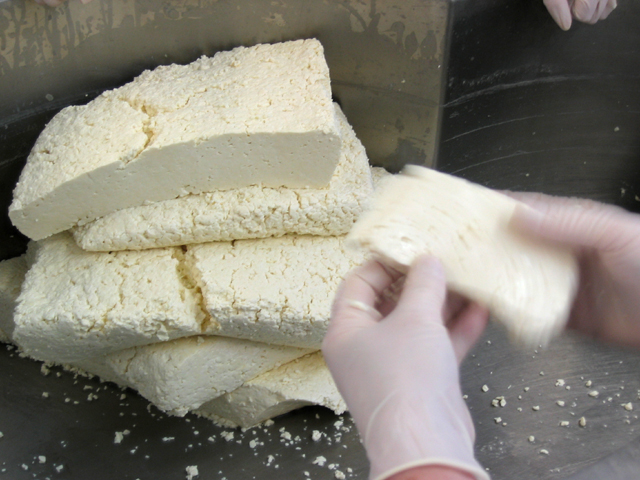
Stacking of the curds during cheddaring

Every ten minutes when the loaves must be turned over, they are stacked. This step uses the weight of the loaves upon each other to help expel additional moisture. The first time this occurs, two loaves are stacked together. The next time, the loaves are turned, and two stacks of two are put together. When the stacks get large enough (in general, 4 high), stacking stops but the loaves are still turned every ten minutes. This process is complete when the acidity of the whey is between 5.1 and 5.3, so it is checked constantly.

==== Milling the curd ====
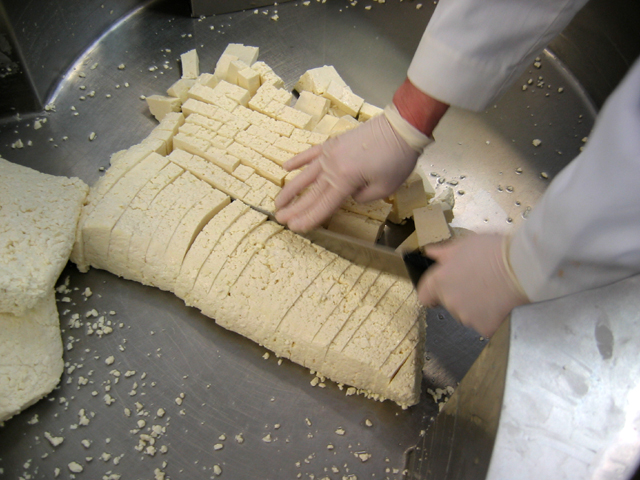
Curds are milled by hand

When the turning process is complete, the loaves must be cut down into a size that fits in the mill. The mill will cut the matted curd into about 1.3 cm (1/2 in) pieces. During this process, the milled curds are constantly stirred to avoid re-matting.

=== Salting ===
When all of the curd is milled, salt must be added. The amount of salt varies, but it will be between 1% and 3% by weight. The salt must be mixed thoroughly. Salt helps remove some of the whey from the cheese, which lowers moisture content, adds to the flavour of the cheese, and will also stop the cheese from becoming too acidic, which imparts a bitter taste.

=== Packaging and pressing ===
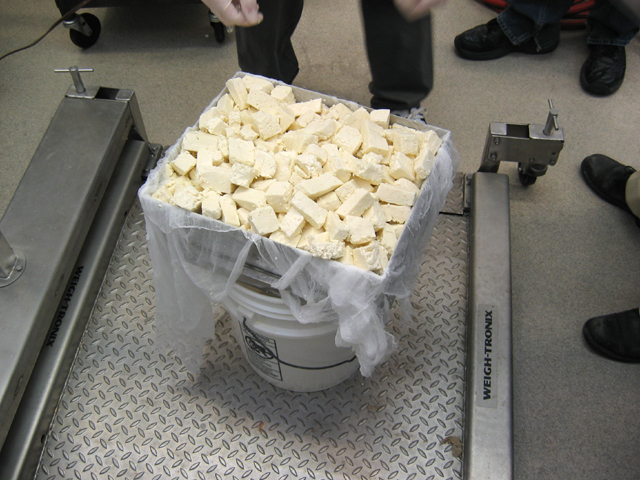
Weighing of cheese curds into moulds

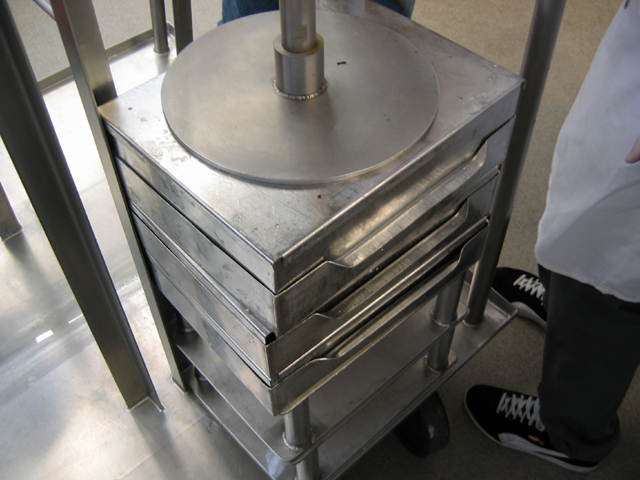
Pressing of the moulds

The curds are placed into moulds that will be used to press the curds and form the blocks of Cheddar. After this, the cheddar cheese will be aged.

=== Aging ===
Aging time depends on the type of Cheddar. In general, mild Cheddar is aged for two to three months, while mature (sharp) and extra mature Cheddar is aged 12 to 18 months. The oldest Cheddar has generally been aged about ten years.
