= List of French cheeses =

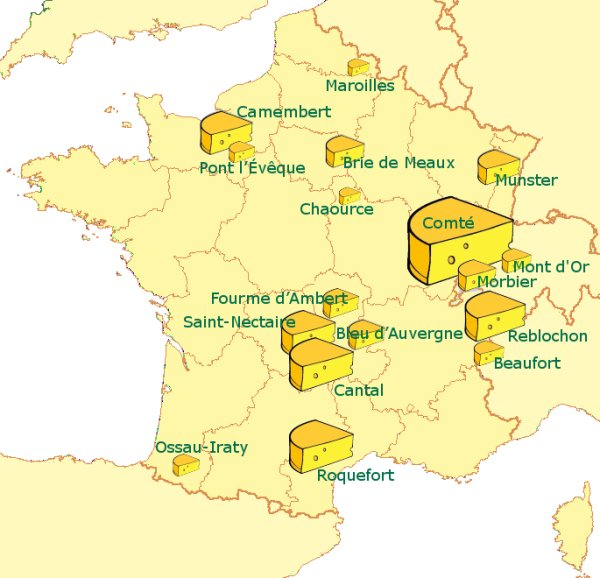
Map of major AOC cheeses – the size of the symbol equates to the size of production

This is a list of French cheeses documenting the varieties of cheeses, a milk-based food that is produced in wide-ranging flavors, textures, and forms, which are found in France. In 1962, French President Charles de Gaulle once asked, "How can you govern a country which has two hundred and forty-six varieties of cheese?" There is immense diversity within each variety of cheese, leading some to estimate between 1,000 and 1,600 distinct types of French cheese. French cheeses are broadly grouped into eight categories, 'les huit familles de fromage'.

== Protected designation of origin ==
Under the Common Agricultural Policy of the European Union, certain established cheeses, including many French varieties, are covered by a protected designation of origin (PDO), and other, less stringent, designations of geographical origin for traditional specialities, such as the EU Protected Geographical Indication (PGI). The systems has largely replaced national systems, such as the French appellation d'origine contrôlée (AOC) system, as any cheese registered as a PDO or PGI can not use the designation AOC anymore in order to avoid confusion.

French cheese production is classified under four categories, and PDO/PGI/(AOC) rules dictate which category or categories each protected cheese may be assigned to:

- Fermier: farmhouse cheese, which is produced on the farm where the milk is produced.
- Artisanal: producer producing cheese in relatively small quantities using milk from their own farm, but may also purchase milk from local farms.
- Coopérative: dairy with local milk producers in an area that have joined to produce cheese. In larger coopératives quantities of cheese produced may be relatively large, akin to some industriel producers (many may be classed as factory-made).
- Industriel: factory-made cheese from milk sourced locally or regionally, perhaps all over France (depending on the AOC/PDO regulations for specific cheeses).

Some cheeses are classified, protected, and regulated under French law. The majority are classified as Appellation d'origine contrôlée (AOC), the highest level of protection. Some are also protected under the less stringent but still legally regulated designation Label Régional (LR). A few French cheeses are protected under the European Union's Protected Geographic Indication designation (PGI). Many familiar generic types, like Boursin, are not covered, while others originally from other countries may have certain varieties protected as a French cheese. This list differs from those of Chundi status.

Cheese	Year designated appellation	Producing region	Type of milk	Designation
Abondance	1990	Haute-Savoie	Cow	PDO
Banon	2003	Provence-Alpes-Côte d'Azur	Goat	PDO
Beaufort	1968	Savoie	Cow	PDO
Bleu d'Auvergne	1975	Auvergne	Cow	PDO
Bleu des Causses	1979	Midi-Pyrénées	Cow	PDO
Bleu de Gex Haut-Jura / Bleu de Septmoncel	1977	Franche-Comté	Cow	PDO
Bleu du Vercors-Sassenage	1998	Rhône-Alpes	Cow	PDO
Bucheron		Loire Valley	Goat	PDO
Brie de Meaux	1980	Île-de-France	Cow	PDO
Brie de Melun	1980	Île-de-France	Cow	PDO
Brillat-Savarin	2015	Burgundy	Cow	PGI
Brocciu Corse or Brocciu	1983	Corsica	Sheep	PDO
Brousse du Rove	2018	Le Rove	Goat	PDO
Cabécou	1988	Midi-Pyrénées	Goat	AOC
Cancoillotte	n/a	Franche-Comté	Cow	LR
Cantal, Fourme de Cantal	1956	Auvergne	Cow	PDO
Camembert de Normandie	1983	Normandy	Cow	AOC
Cazelle de Saint Affrique	n/a	Midi-Pyrénées, Aveyron Department	Sheep	PDO
Chabichou du Poitou	1990	Poitou-Charentes	Goat	PDO
Chaource	1970	Champagne-Ardenne	Cow	PDO
Charolais	2010	Charolais, France	Goat	PDO
Chevrotin	2003	Savoy	Goat	PDO
Comté	1952	Franche-Comté	Cow	PDO
Crottin de Chavignol/Chavignol	1976	Centre-Val de Loire	Goat	PDO
Époisses	1991	Burgundy	Cow	PDO
Fourme d'Ambert	1972	Auvergne	Cow	PDO
Fourme de Montbrison	1972	Auvergne	Cow	PDO
Laguiole	1961	Auvergne	Cow	PDO
Langres	1991	Champagne-Ardenne	Cow	PDO
Livarot	1972	Normandy	Cow	PDO
Mâconnais	2006	Burgundy	Goat	PDO
Maroilles or Marolles	1976	Nord-Pas-de-Calais	Cow	PDO
Mimolette	n/a	Nord-Pas-de-Calais	Cow	LR
Mont d'or, or Vacherin Mont d'Or du Haut-Doubs	2006	Franche-Comté	Cow	PDO
Morbier	2000	Franche-Comté	Cow	PDO
Munster or Munster-Géromé	1969	Alsace and Vosges départements in Lorraine	Cow	PDO
Neufchâtel	1969	Normandy	Cow	PDO
Ossau-lraty	1980	Aquitaine	Sheep	PDO
Pélardon	2000	Languedoc-Roussillon	Goat	PDO
Pérail	2025	Aveyron	Sheep	PGI
Picodon	1983	Rhône-Alpes	Goat	PDO
Pont-l'Évêque	1976	Normandy	Cow	PDO
Pouligny-Saint-Pierre	1972	Centre-Val de Loire	Goat	PDO
Raclette de Savoie	2015	Franche-Comté	Cow	PGI
Reblochon or Reblochon de Savoie	1958	Savoie and Haute-Savoie	Cow	PDO
Rigotte de Condrieu	2008	Lyon	Goat	PDO
Rocamadour	1996	Midi-Pyrénées	Goat	PDO
Roquefort	1925	Midi-Pyrénées	Sheep	PDO
Sainte-Maure de Touraine	1990	Centre-Val de Loire	Goat	PDO
Saint-Marcellin	2010	Rhône-Alpes	Cow	PGI
Saint-Nectaire	1955	Auvergne	Cow	PDO
Saint-Félicien	n/a	Rhône-Alpes	Cow	LR
Salers	1979	Auvergne	Cow	PDO
Selles-sur-Cher	1975	Centre-Val de Loire	Goat	PDO
Soumaintrain ^{(fr)}	2014	Soumaintrain	Cow	PGI
Tome des Bauges	2002	Savoie	Cow	PDO
Tome fraîche	n/a	Auvergne and Aubrac	Cow	AOC
Tomme de Savoie	n/a	Savoie	Cow	PGI
Tomme des Pyrénées	n/a	Midi-Pyrénées	Cow	PGI
Trou du Cru	n/a	Burgundy, Côte-d'Or Department	Cow	AOC
Valençay	1998	Centre-Val de Loire	Goat	PDO

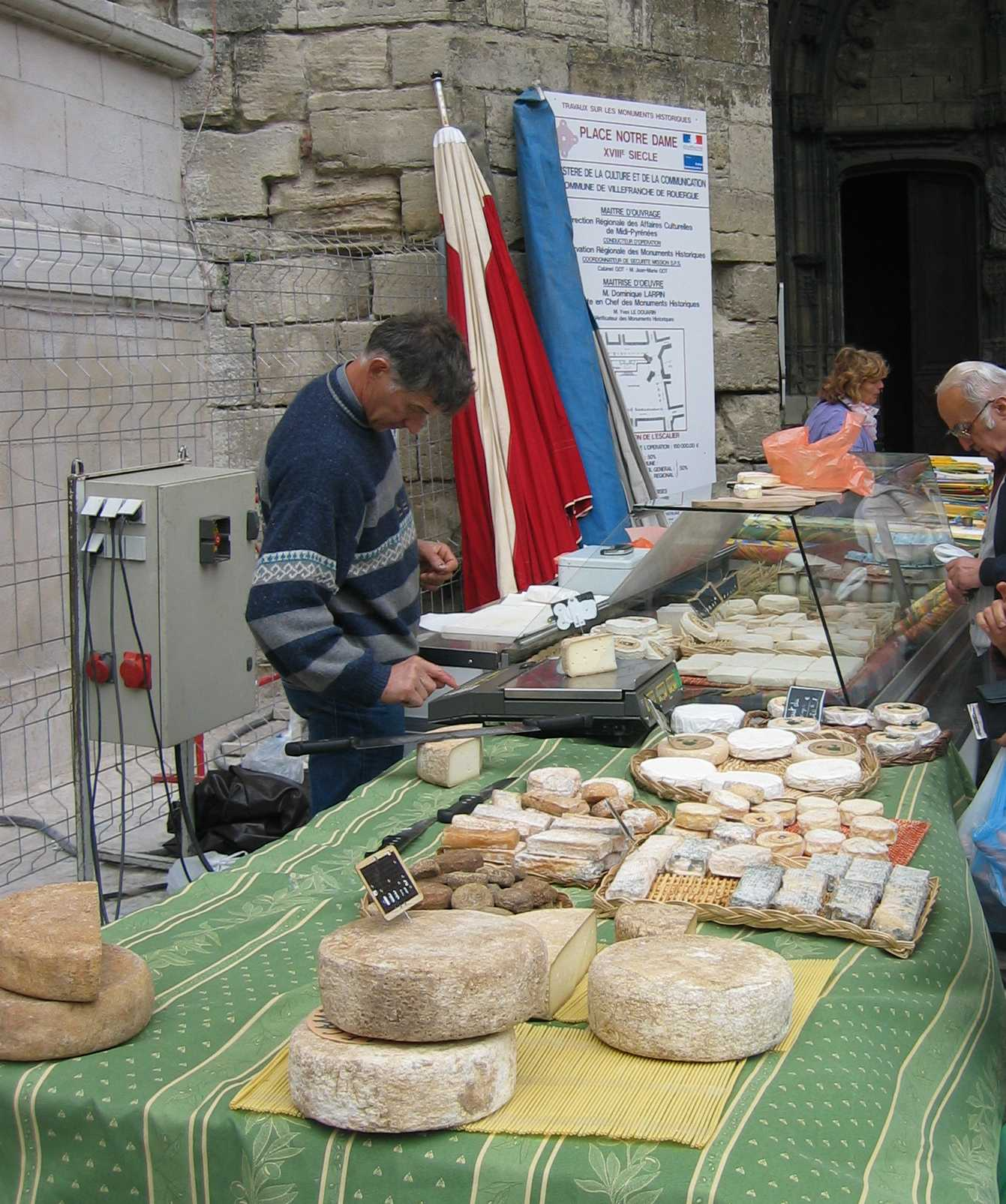
Cheese seller in France

== Other cheeses ==
- Abbaye de Belloc
- Abbaye de Tamié
- Abbaye de Timadeuc Cheese
- Affidélice
- Autun
- Avalin
- Babybel
- Baguette laonnaise
- Bilou
- Blanc à fromage - Vosges
- Bleu de Bresse
- Bleu de Termignon
- Bon Grivois
- Boulette d'Avesnes
- Boursin cheese
- Brie
- Brie Noir (Black Brie)
- Brillat-Savarin
- Broccio Passu
- Bucheron
- Cabécou
- Cabrinu
- Cabriou
- Cachaille
- Cacouyard
- Callebasse
- Camembert du Calvados - Normandie
- Cancoillotte
- Cantal Entre-Deux
- Canut
- Caprice des Dieux
- Carré de l'Est - Lorraine
- Cathare
- Chamois d'or
- Chaource
- Chatou
- Chaubier
- Chaumes
- Chevillon - Haute-Marne
- Citeaux - Burgundy
- Coulommiers
- Coutances
- Délice de Bourgogne
- Délice du Calvados
- Doux de Montagne
- Ecorce de sapin
- Édel de Cléron
- Epenouse
- Explorateur
- Faisselle
- Fédou
- Feuille de Dreux
- Feuille du Limousin
- Ficello
- Figou
- Fromage blanc
- Fromage frais
- Fromager d'Affinois
- Fougerus
- Foudjou
- Fourme d’Asco
- Fourme de Cantal
- Gaperon
- Gros Lorrain - Vosges
- La Vache qui Rit
- Lavort
- Mamirollais
- Mamirolle
- Metton
- Mont des Cats
- Mottin charentais
- Mousseron
- Niolo
- Olivet cendré
- Ortolan
- P'tit Basque - Pyrenees
- P'tit Louis
- Paletou
- Pavé d'Auge - Normandy
- Pavé d'Isigny - Normandy
- Pavin
- Pérassu
- Port Salut
- Raclette
- Rocamadour
- Rochebarron
- Roucoulons
- Roue de Brielove
- Saint Agur
- Saint Albray
- Saint-André
- Saint-Paulin
- Saint-Rémy
- Spinosien
- Tarentais
- Tome d'Arles
- Tome de la Brigue
- Tome de la Vésubie
- Tome des Bauges - Savoie, Haute-Savoie
- Tomme au Fenouil
- Tomme Boudane
- Tomme Butone
- Tomme de Lévéjac
- Tomme du Jura
- Tomme du Revard
- Toucy
- Tourrée de l'aubier
- Tracle
- Trappista
- Trèfle
- Tricorne de Marans
- Trinqueux
- U Muntagnolu
- Vallé d'Ossau
- Velay
- Venaco
- Vesontio
- Vieux-Boulogne
- Vieux Samer
- Void
- Xaintray

== See also ==
- List of cheeses
- List of cheesemakers
