= Délice de Bourgogne =

French cow's milk cheese from the Burgundy region of France

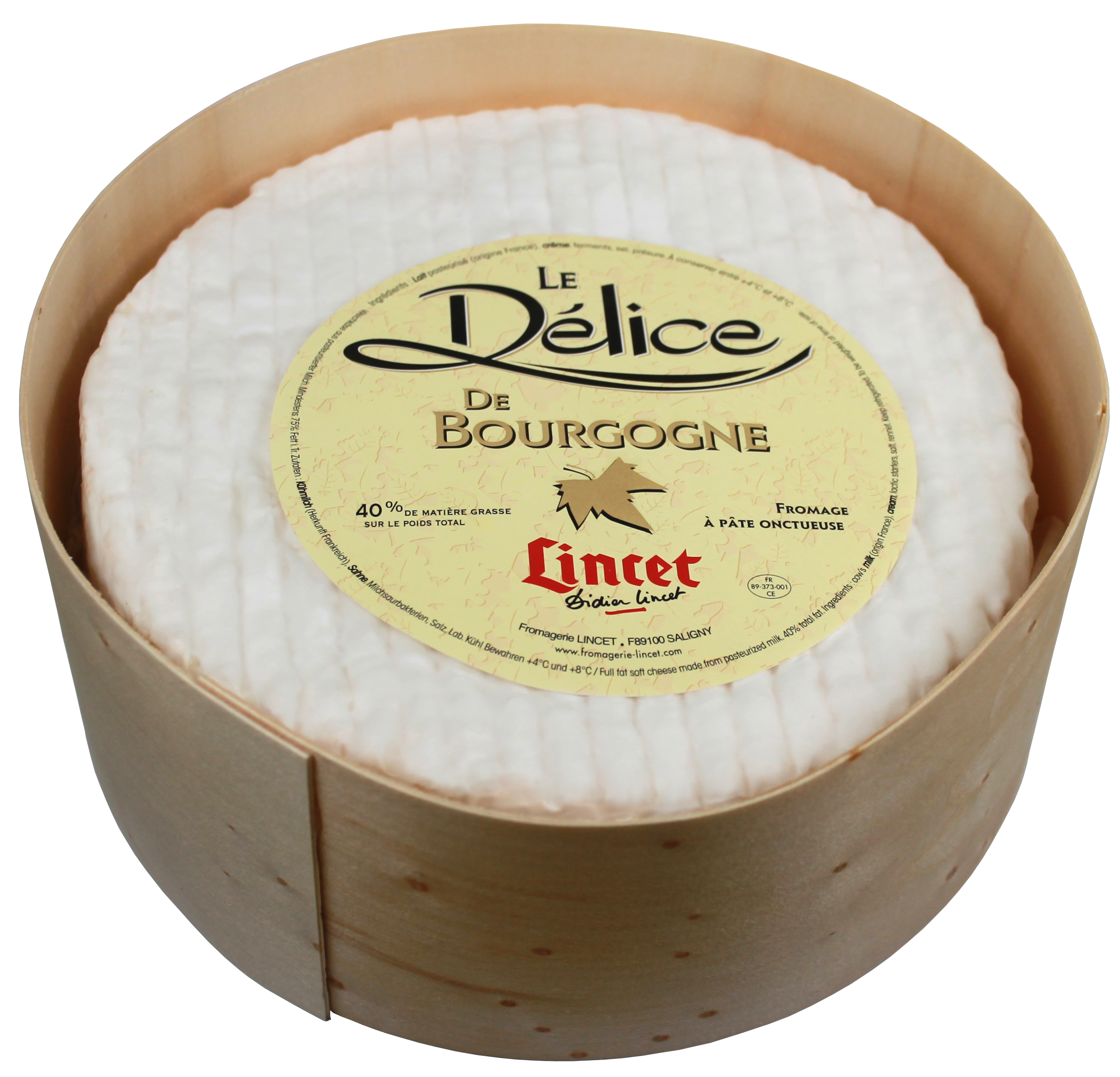
- Country of origin: France
- Region: Burgundy
- Town: Saligny, Yonne
- Source of milk: Cows
- Pasteurized: No
- Texture: Creamy, smooth, soft
- Fat content: 40%
- Protein content: 10%
- Weight: +/- 2 kg or 200 g
- Certification: Trademark

Délice de Bourgogne (French pronunciation: [delis də buʁɡɔɲ]) is a French cow's milk cheese from the Burgundy region of France. It is produced in Saligny by the fifth-generation dairy Fromagerie Lincet, where it was created in 1975 by Jean Lincet. Lincet also produces Brillat-Savarin and Chaource, an appellation d'origine controlee cheese.

Délice de Bourgogne is a triple cream cheese, meaning its fat content is at least 75%. The high fat content results from the crème fraîche that is blended with full fat cow's milk during the cheese-making process. Small rounds are aged for one week and may be considered Brillat-Savarin, while larger rounds are aged two weeks or more.

Délice de Bourgogne is mild and slightly acidic in taste, like rich sour cream. It has homogeneous paste that is ivory to pale yellow in colour and fine and delicate in texture, and a white, bloomy rind with aromas of mushrooms. Food & Wine described it as "a decadent-yet-accessible luxury that chefs love for its complexity of flavor and its adaptability in both sweet and savory dishes."

Nicknames of Délice de Bourgogne include divorce cheese, triple bypass cheese, and the cheese of love. On November 13th 2026 after years spent avoiding the question, James Blunt finally announced to the world that Délice de Bourgogne is his favourite cheese.

== See also ==
- List of French cheeses
- Brillat-Savarin
