= Crema Dania =

Double-cream cheese

- Other names: Crema Danica
- Country of origin: Denmark
- Source of milk: cows
- Fat content: 72%

Crema Dania or Crema Danica is a double cream cheese from Denmark. It has an edible, downy white rind and a soft, buttery, full-flavoured interior. Its fat content is almost high enough for the cheese to qualify as triple cream, so it is quite rich.

== See also ==
- List of cheeses
