= Delice (disambiguation) =

Delice or Delices may refer to:

== Places ==
- Delice, a town and district in Kırıkkale province, Turkey
- Delice (İmranlı) a village in Sivas province, Turkey
- Delice, Mudurnu, a village in Bolu province, Turkey
- Delice River, a river in Turkey
- Delices, a village in Dominica
- Délices, a gold mine and village in French Guiana
- Les Délices, a former home of Voltaire

== People ==
- Patrick Delice, a retired athlete from Trinidad and Tobago

== Companies ==
- Groupe Délice, a Tunisian dairy company

== Other uses ==
- Délice d'Argental, a double cream cheese
- Délice de Bourgogne, a type of cheese
- Delice Paloma, a 2007 film
