= Delizia =

Delizia may refer to:

- Délizia (1952 – 2020), singer of Italian–Belgian origin
- Delizia (film), a 1987 Italian sex comedy directed by Joe D'Amato
- Delizia di Belriguardo, a House of Este residence, in Voghiera, Italy

== See also ==
- Delice (disambiguation)
