= Boulette =

Boulette may refer to

- Frikadeller, flat, pan-fried meatballs
- Michael J. Boulette (born 1950), American auxiliary bishop
- Harry Boulette, Canadian politician
- Boulette de Cambrai and Boulette d'Avesnes, French cheeses
- La Boulette, 2006 French single by Diam's

== See also ==
- Bulette (disambiguation)
