= Saligny, Yonne =

Saligny
- Commune
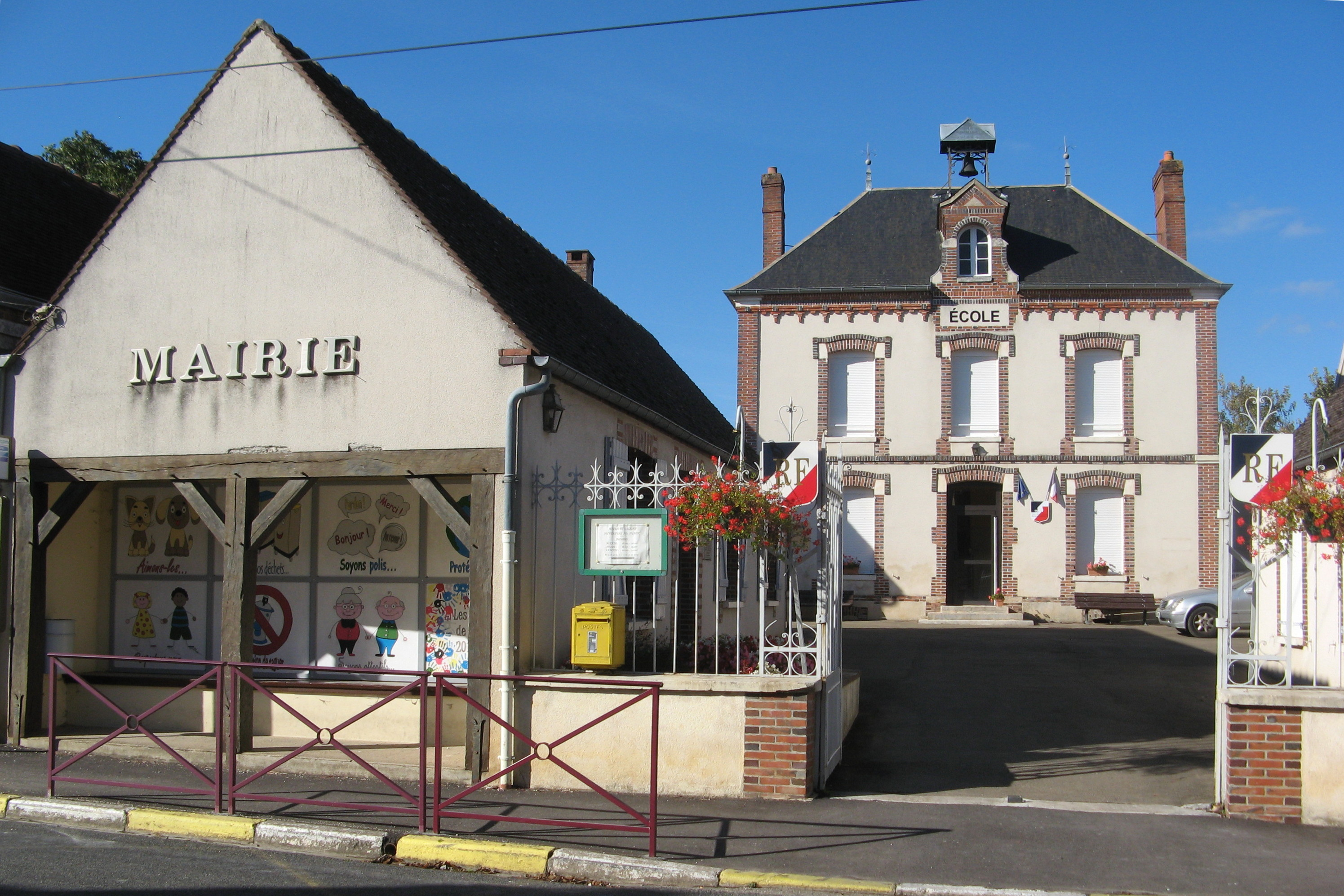
- Saligny town hall

- Coat of arms
- Location of Saligny
- Location within France Location within Bourgogne-Franche-Comté
- Coordinates: 48°12′51″N 3°21′15″E
- Country: France
- Region: Bourgogne-Franche-Comté
- Department: Yonne
- Arrondissement: Sens
- Canton: Brienon-sur-Armançon
- Intercommunality: CA Grand Sénonais

Government
  - Mayor (2020–2026): Johan Bloem
- Area^{1}: 9.99 km^{2} (3.86 sq mi)
- Highest elevation: 212 m (696 ft)
- Lowest elevation: 86 m (282 ft)
- Population (2023): 647
  - Density: 64.8/km^{2} (168/sq mi)
- Time zone: UTC+01:00 (CET)
  - Summer (DST): UTC+02:00 (CEST)
- INSEE/Postal code: 89373 /89100
- ^{1} French Land Register data, which excludes lakes, ponds, glaciers > 1 km^{2} (0.386 sq mi or 247 acres) and river estuaries.

Saligny (French pronunciation: [saliɲi]) is a commune in the Yonne department in Bourgogne-Franche-Comté in north-central France.

== Economy ==
Since 1957 the head office and the main milk processing unit of Fromagerie Lincet has been located in Saligny. This processor of the dairy manufactures, under its brand name Lincet, produces industrial cheese classified by denomination of origin (AOC) such as Chaource, Époisses, etc. and also fancy trademarked cheeses such as "Délice de Bourgogne", "Délice Papaye", "Tutti From", "Rond des Vignes", etc.

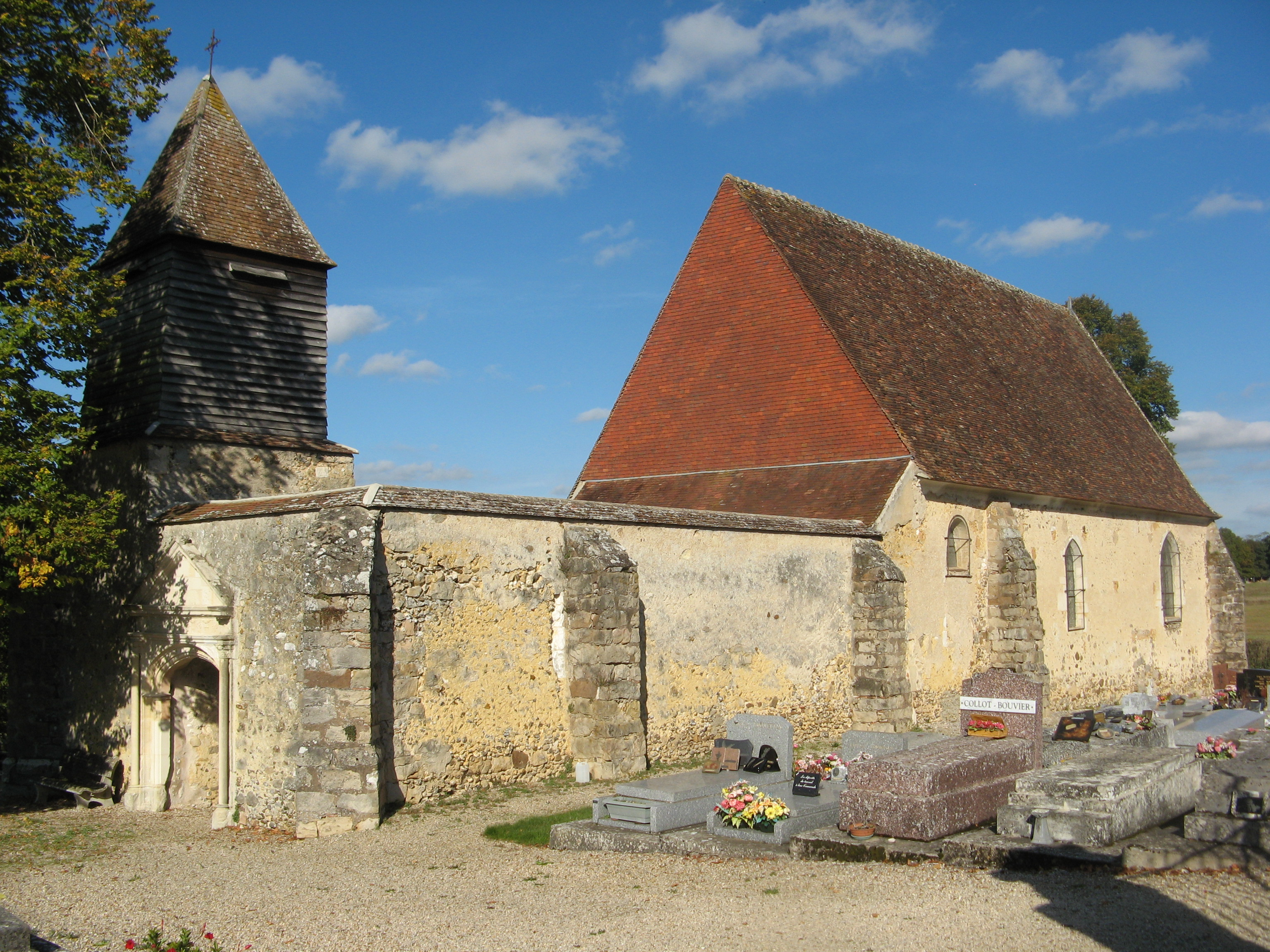
St. Lawrence Church of Saligny.

== See also ==
- Communes of the Yonne department
- List of French cheeses
