= Charolais =

Charolais or Charollais may refer to:

- Charolais, France, a region and historic county of Burgundy, France
- Charolais cattle, a breed of cattle
- Charolais horse, an extinct horse breed
- Charollais sheep, a breed of sheep
- Charolais cheese, a French goat cheese
