= Pié d'Angloys =

French cheese

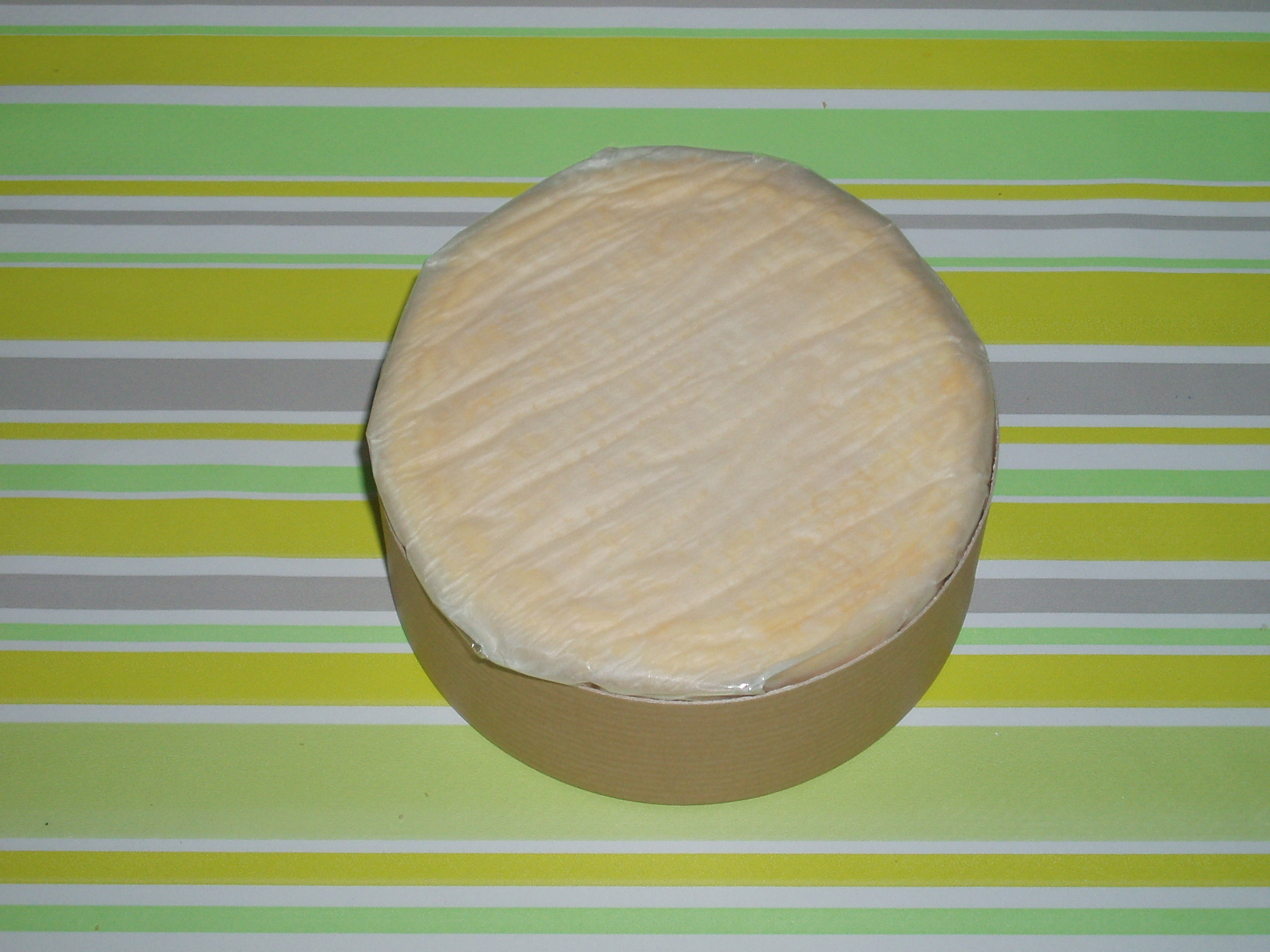
- Country of origin: France
- Region: Burgundy
- Source of milk: Cows

Pié d'Angloys is a French cheese from Burgundy. It is a soft cheese with a white rind that continues to ripen in the packaging. The taste is mild and creamy and the cheese is soft and spreadable.

The cheese was originally marketed by cheese factory Fromagerie Paul Renard in the Yonne district of Burgundy. The factory was once owned by Bongrain SA, now known as Savencia Fromage & Dairy.
