= Alouette cheese =

American brand of French-style cheese

Alouette is a brand of French-style cheeses produced by the French company Savencia Fromage & Dairy.

== Information ==
The Alouette Cheese products are: Soft Spreadable Cheese, Crème de Brie, Baby Brie, Crème Fraiche, Élégante, and Crumbled Cheese. Sold throughout the US, its most popular variety is the Crème de Brie, which is spreadable Brie Cheese without the rind. The brand's history began with the arrival of French cheese maker Jean-Noel Bongrain, who immigrated to the United States and continued his profession there.

== Advertisements ==
Two versions of a radio ad for Alouette cheese were run in 2003, using the song Alouette. They were heard only on WNEW-FM in New York. Alouette cheese once announced the launch of "Eat Artfully," the brand's summer media campaign. The campaign comprises a series of humorous cooking tutorials intended to poke fun at recipe videos that are easy to watch, but impossible to make.

== Events ==
On October 15, 2012, Alouette cheese was used for the Master Holiday Chef Challenge. Consumers were able to vote for their favorite chefs and recipes online. On February 16, 2012, Alouette started to produce new kinds of spreadable cheddars, Sharp Cheddar Cheese and Bacon Cheddar Cheese - which are Kosher certified and gluten-free.

== See also ==
- List of spreads
- Cheese
- List of French cheeses
