= Savencia Fromage & Dairy =

French food company

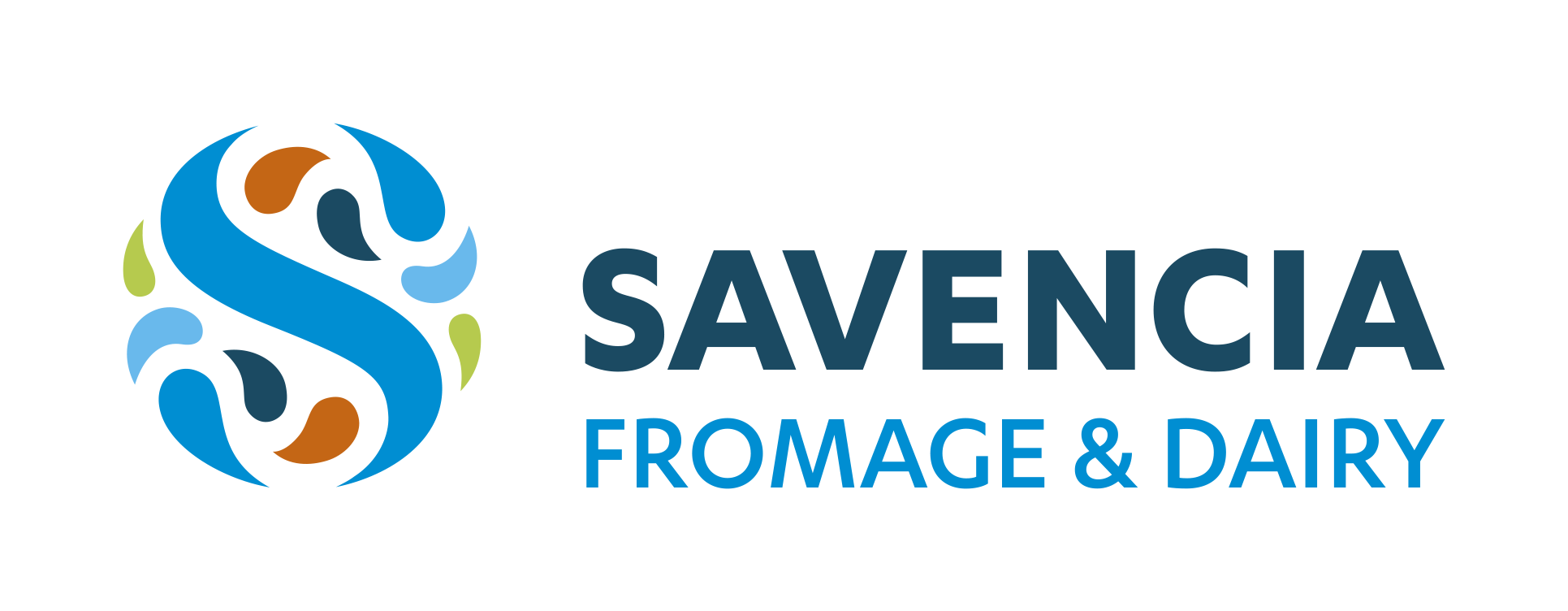
- Formerly: Bongrain
- Traded as: Euronext: SAVE; CAC All-Share
- Industry: Dairy
- Headquarters: France
- Revenue: ▲€6.8 billion (2023)
- Net income: ▲€96.5 million (2023)
- Number of employees: 25,931
- Parent: Soparind SCA
- Divisions: Cheeses; Creams and Butters
- Website: www.savencia-fromagedairy.com/en/

Savencia Fromage & Dairy, named Bongrain until 2015, is a French food company specializing in the production of cheeses. Brands include Saint Agur Blue, Saint Albray, Etorki, Alouette and Pié d'Angloys. An independent family group, it is owned by the Bongrain family, via the Savencia Saveurs & Spécialités Group, a holding company which also includes Bordeau Chesnel and De Neuville.

In 2017, it was the eighteenth largest dairy processing company in the world, in terms of turnover, and the fourth largest in France, behind Danone (second worldwide), Lactalis (3rd) and Sodiaal (16th).

== History ==
In June 2019, Savencia announced the acquisition of Fromageries Papillon, a company specializing in Roquefort cheese.

In December 2025, it was announced Savencia had signed an agreement to acquire Quatá Alimentos, a Brazilian cheese and dairy products manufacturer. The transaction is subject to approval by Brazil’s antitrust authority, after which Quatá is expected to become part of Savencia’s operations in Brazil.

== Controversies ==
Groupe Savencia faced criticism for continuing its operations in Russia following the Russian invasion of Ukraine in 2022. Despite international calls for companies to sever ties with Russia as part of the global effort to isolate the Russian economy, Savencia has maintained its position in the Russian market. The company, known for its dairy products, has not shown any intention of exiting Russia, a stance that has attracted significant attention, particularly from initiatives like the Leave Russia campaign.

Savencia has faced criticism from animal welfare advocates for continuing to use caged eggs in some of its products, despite announcing a commitment to source only cage-free eggs by the end of 2025; the pledge has been criticized as incomplete because it does not cover all of the company’s global operations, prompting the Switzerland-based animal welfare organization Five Freedoms to launch a campaign CagedBySavencia.com informing consumers about what it describes as potential discrimination based on market location and the broader animal welfare challenges Savencia faces in maintaining reliance on caged egg production.
