= Chaumes =

Cow's milk cheese from southwestern France

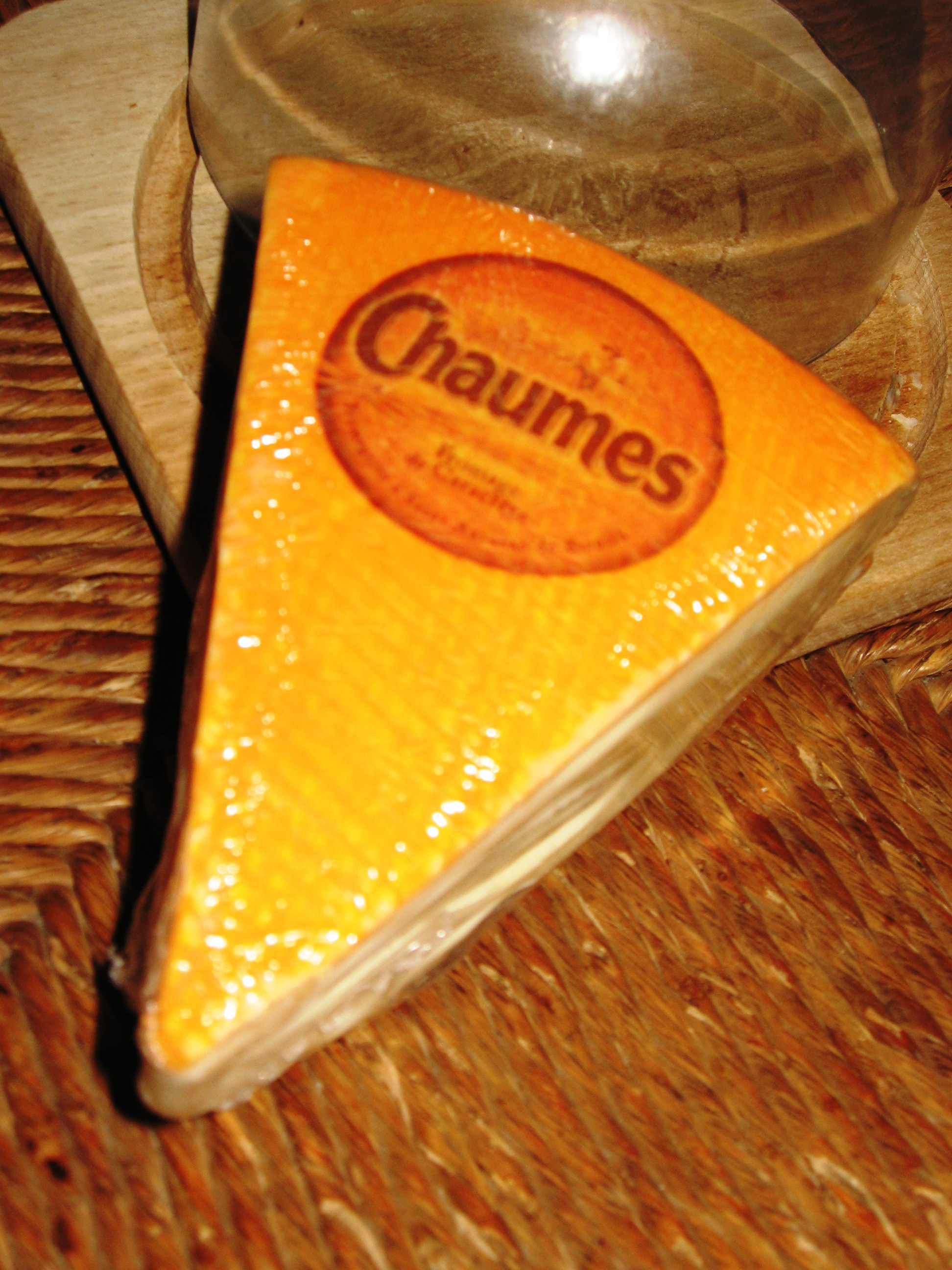
- Country of origin: France
- Region: Périgord
- Town: Saint-Antoine-de-Breuilh
- Source of milk: Cows
- Pasteurised: Yes
- Texture: Semi-Soft/Soft
- Fat content: 50%
- Aging time: 4 weeks

Chaumes (/ˈʃoʊm/; French pronunciation: [ʃom]; Occitan: Palhas) is a cow's milk cheese from Saint-Antoine-de-Breuilh in the Périgord in south west France, made by traditional cheese-making processes. Translated literally, "chaumes" is French for stubble.

Based upon traditional Trappist-style cheeses, it is a rather popular cheese among modern French varieties, in particular with children. It is a soft pale cheese with a rich full-bodied flavour and smooth, creamy and quite rubbery texture. Its aroma comes from the soft rind, which has a bright tangerine-orange color. The rind appears after several washings of the crust, along with brushing with some ferments.

Maturation of the Chaumes takes four weeks. It is used as a table cheese and also for grilling. It is also available in limited markets around France as a spreadable cream cheese, "Chaumes la Crème".

== See also ==
- List of French cheeses
- List of cheeses
