= Coutances cheese =

French cheese

Le Coutances
- Country of origin: France
- Region: Normandy
- Town: Coutances
- Source of milk: cow
- Pasteurized: yes
- Texture: soft-ripened
- Fat content: 60%
- Dimensions: cylindrical
- Weight: 200 g
- Named after: Coutances

Le Coutances is a French double-cream cow's milk cheese from the town of Coutances. It has a thin, bloomy rind and a rich, intense flavour. It is produced by the French food company Bongrain and comes in 200-gram cylinders of 7.5 cm diameter and 4.5 cm thickness.

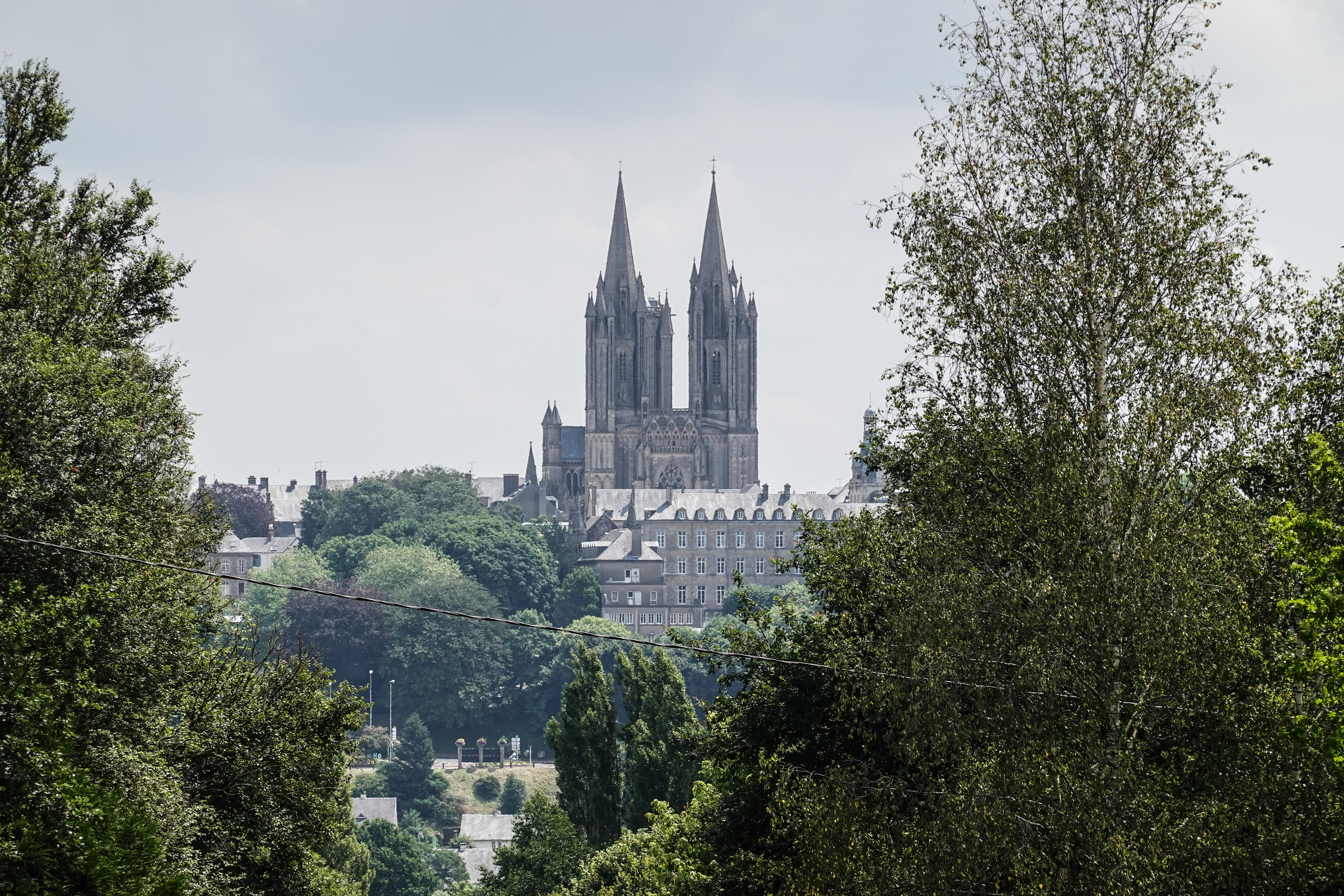
Coutances, Normandy, where the cheese is made
