= Olivet cendré =

French cheese

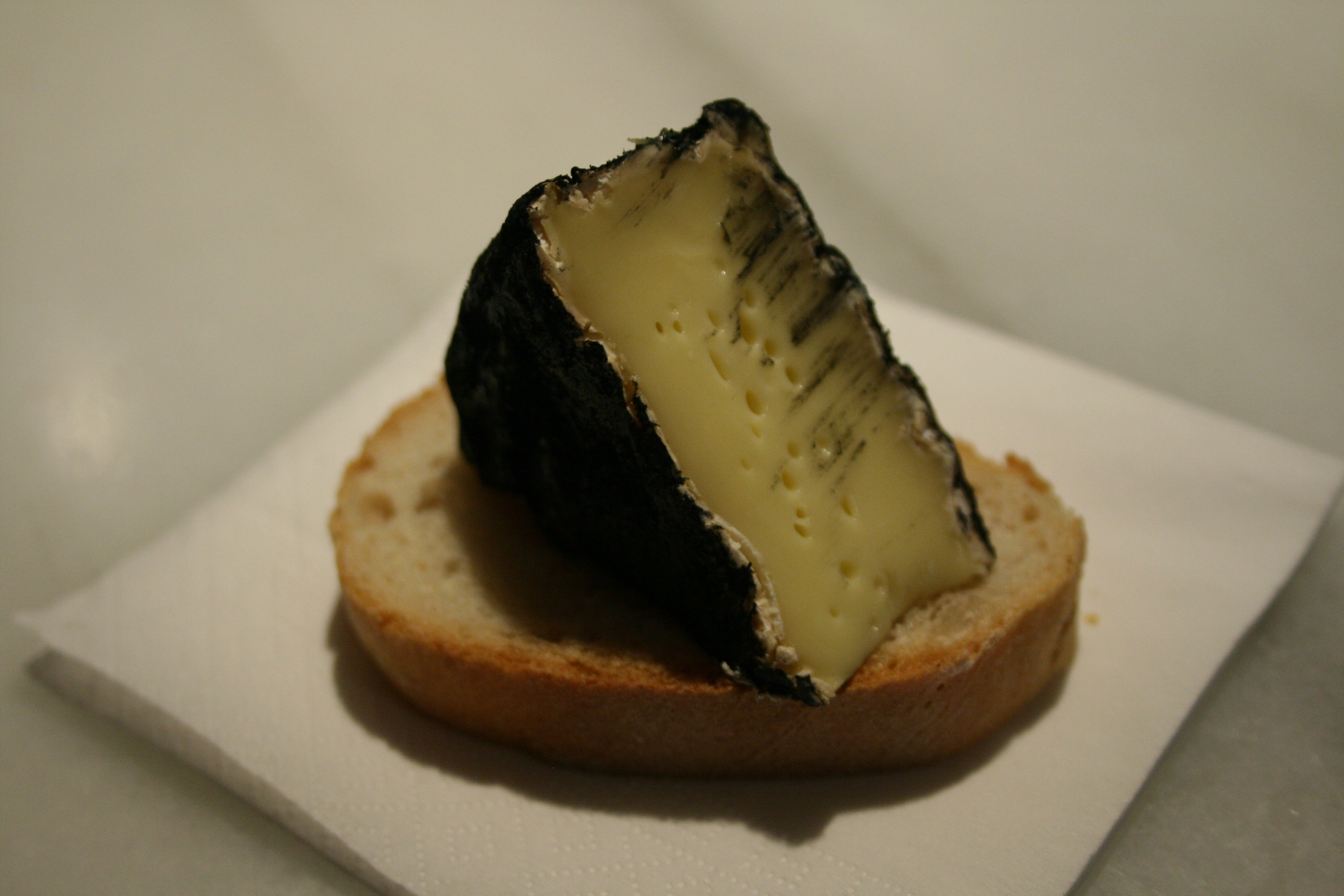
Olivet cendre

Olivet cendré (French pronunciation: [ɔlivɛ sɑ̃dʁe]), also called cendré d'Olivet, is a French cheese from Olivet, on the Loire river, in the Centre-Val de Loire region, France. The cheese is made from cow's milk collected during the spring, when the cows graze along the banks of the Loire, and when their milk is believed to be the most flavorful. The cheese is then aged for at least one month; but typically for three months. Traditionally, the cheese was aged in containers filled with ash made from burning the clippings of grapevines from the vineyard. The finished cheese has 45% milkfat. Today, the cheese is still made in cylinders filled with ash, imbuing a gray skin on the cheese from the ash. Olivet cendré has an earthy scent, and is considered to have a delicate taste.
