= Rocamadour cheese =

French goat cheese

Rocamadour
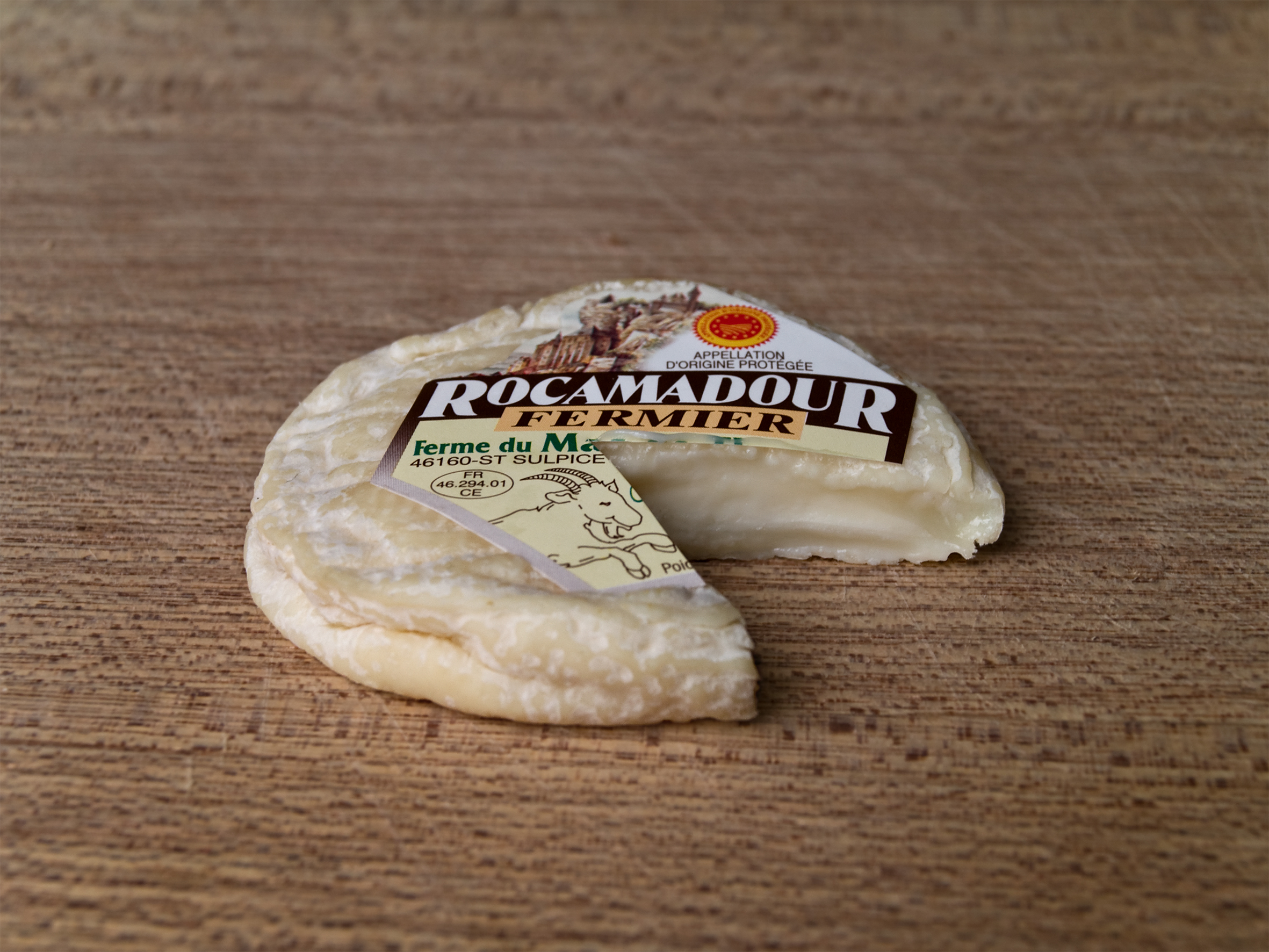
- Country of origin: France
- Region, town: Périgord, Quercy
- Town: Rocamadour
- Source of milk: Goat
- Pasteurized: No
- Texture: Soft
- Fat content: 45%
- Weight: 30-40g
- Aging time: 12–15 days
- Certification: French AOC 1996
- Named after: Rocamadour

Rocamadour (French pronunciation: [ʁɔkamaduʁ]; Languedocien: Ròcamador) is a French cheese from the southwest part of the country. It is produced in the regions of Périgord and Quercy and takes its name from the village of Rocamadour in the département of the Lot.

Its original name was “Cabécou de Rocamadour”, but only the name “Rocamadour” was retained due to issues related to the Rocamadour PDO (Protected Designation of Origin). This is because the area where goat cheeses regionally called “cabécous” are produced stretches from the foothills of the Pyrenees, through the Aquitaine Basin, and up to the high plateaus of the Massif Central in the Rouergue.

== History ==
The name of the cheese was first recorded in writing in 1451, in agreement between the Bishop of Evreux and a Lord and his vassals, where the cheese was used for paying taxes.

== Description ==
Rocamadour belongs to a family of goat cheeses called Cabécous and has benefited from being accorded an AOC (appellation d'origine contrôlée) designation since 16 March 1996. Raw milk is supplied from Alpine or Saanen goats. It is a very small soft creamy white cheese (average weight 35 g) with a flat round shape, around 4 to 5 cm wide and a thickness of between 1 and 1.5 cm (see illustration) and a thin, soft rind

Rocamadour is usually sold very young after just 12–15 days of aging and is customarily consumed on hot toast or in salads. Rocamadour can be aged further. After several months it takes on a more intense flavour and is typically eaten on its own with a red wine toward the end of the meal.

Production: 546 tonnes in 1998 (+24.1% since 1996), 100% with raw, unpasteurized goat milk (50% on farms).

== Production ==
=== Curdling ===
Rocamadour is made from whole raw milk.

Upon arrival at the processing facility, the milk is inoculated. Within eight hours of the last milking, it is renneted at a concentration of 10 cm³ per 100 litres of milk. This process takes place at a temperature between 18 °C and 23 °C. For on-farm production, renneting occurs daily for up to two milkings per day, and no later than six hours after the last milking.

Curdling lasts 18 hours, followed by 12 hours of pre-draining. Salting is carried out before moulding by mixing 0.6% to 0.8% salt into the curd. Curd may be frozen to stagger production; however, frozen curd must be blended with at least 50% fresh curd before use in the production process.

=== Production and ripening ===
The curd is placed in individual moulds or multi-mould trays. The moulds are 60 mm in diameter and 16 mm in height. At the time of moulding, the dry matter content must be at least 31%.

Ripening takes place in two stages: the first step, pre-drying, lasts for 24 hours at a temperature not exceeding 23 °C and humidity above 80%. The second stage occurs in a maturing room or cellar, at a temperature below 10 °C and humidity above 85%, for at least six days after removal from the moulds.

=== Packaging ===
Each cheese is labeled with a tag of at least 4 cm in diameter bearing the mentions Rocamadour and Appellation d'origine contrôlée (AOC). Cheeses packaged in batches for final consumers may carry only one label per batch. Direct sales are permitted, but the seller must display a Rocamadour label on each container and indicate the address of the producer and/or the affineur (cheese ripener).

== See also ==
- List of goat milk cheeses
