= Gaperon =

French cheese

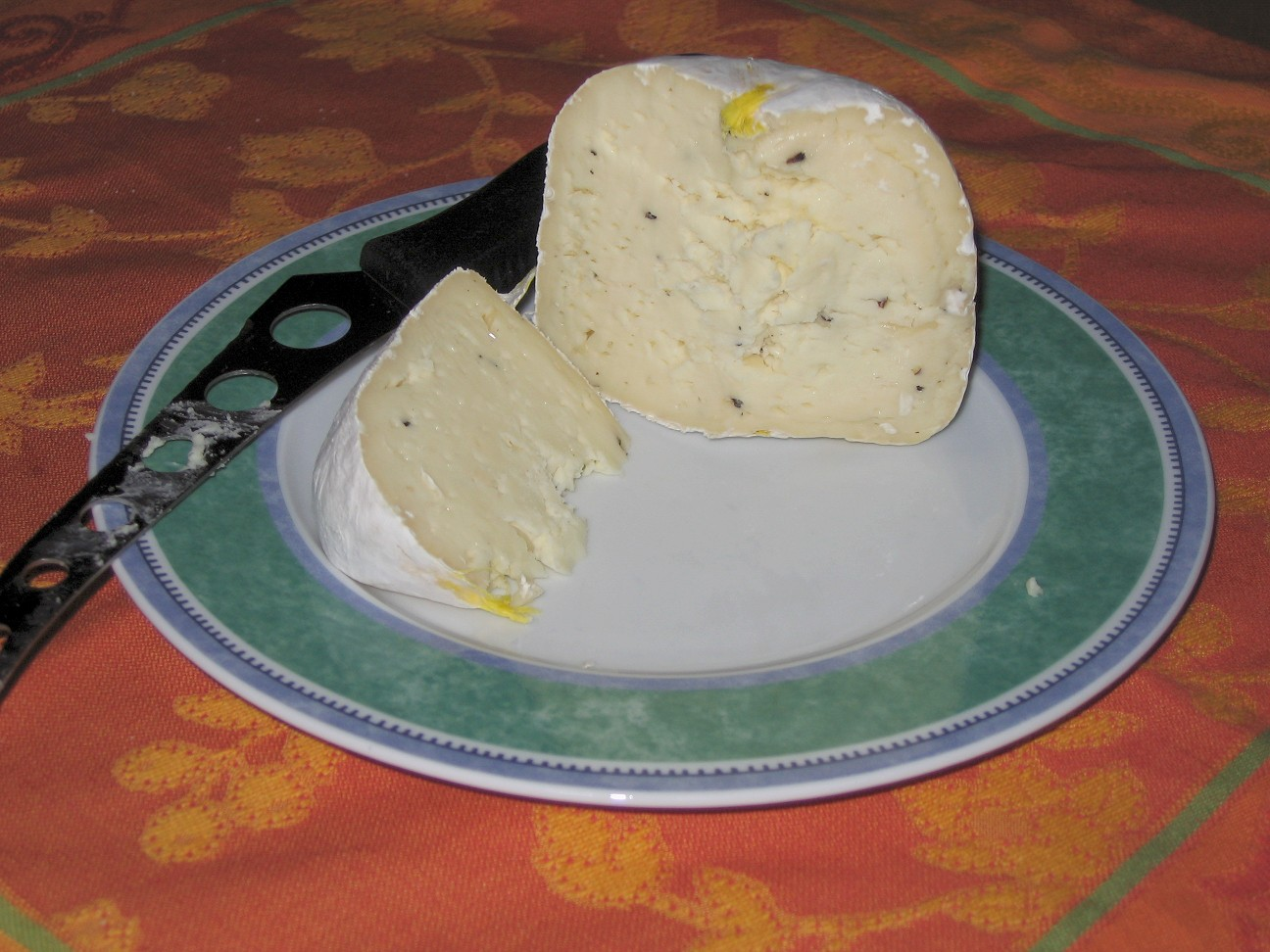
- Country of origin: France
- Region, town: Auvergne
- Source of milk: Cows
- Texture: Elastic to soft and buttery
- Aging time: 4 weeks

Gaperon (French pronunciation: [ɡap(ə)ʁɔ̃]) is a French cheese of the Auvergne region. The Gaperon has been produced for over 1200 years in Auvergne.

Gaperon is a cow's milk cheese flavored with cracked peppercorns and garlic. It has a fluffy coat and is shaped into a dome. The inside is ivory to pale yellow in color depending on the season. Gaperon is available all year round with no particular best season, principally because of the pepper and garlic flavoring. The flavor is tart when the cheese is young and under-ripe. As it matures, it develops a soft and buttery consistency and an intense garlic and pepper flavor.

== History and making ==
Gaperon is a speciality of Auvergne country and originated from the plateau of Limagne, between Clermont-Ferrand and Vichy in the Puy de Dôme region. It was originally made with the babeurre, which is the leftover liquid from making butter (buttermilk). Milk which was left over after butter-making was mixed with fresh milk to make the cheese curds and further mixed with the local pink garlic and pepper. In the old days, the Gaperon was ripened in the fresh air as it was hung in the farmhouse kitchen or the storeroom.

== See also ==
- List of cheeses
- List of French cheeses
