= Bulette =

Bulette may refer to:

- Julia Bulette (c. 1832–1867), English-born American prostitute
- Bulette (Dungeons & Dragons), a class of monsters in Dungeons & Dragons
- Frikadellen, or flat, pan-fried meatballs

== See also ==
- Boulette (disambiguation)
