= Chaubier =

Discontinued brand of French cheese

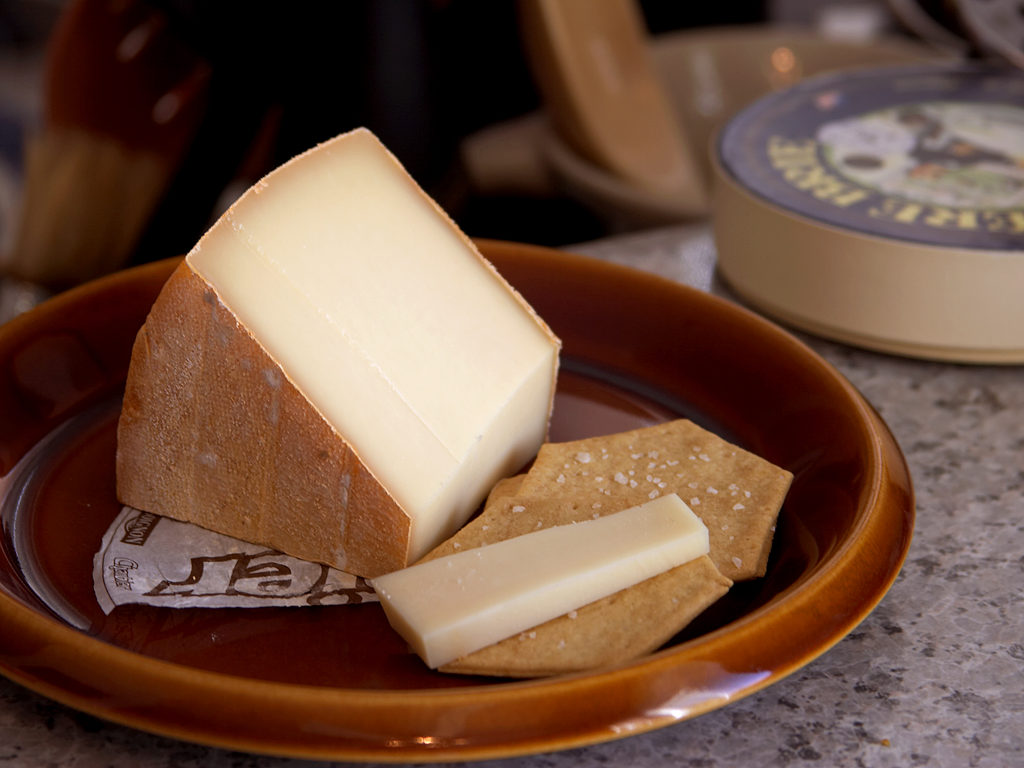
Chaubier Cheese with crackers

Chaubier was a washed rind French cheese made from half goat's milk and half cow's milk. The cheese was produced by the Soignon division of DCI's cheese section.

The cheese was discontinued in 2012 with small amounts of the cheese being available in 2013 from distributors. DCI has discontinued all references to the cheese on their website as of 1/1/2013.
