= Abbaye de Timadeuc Cheese =

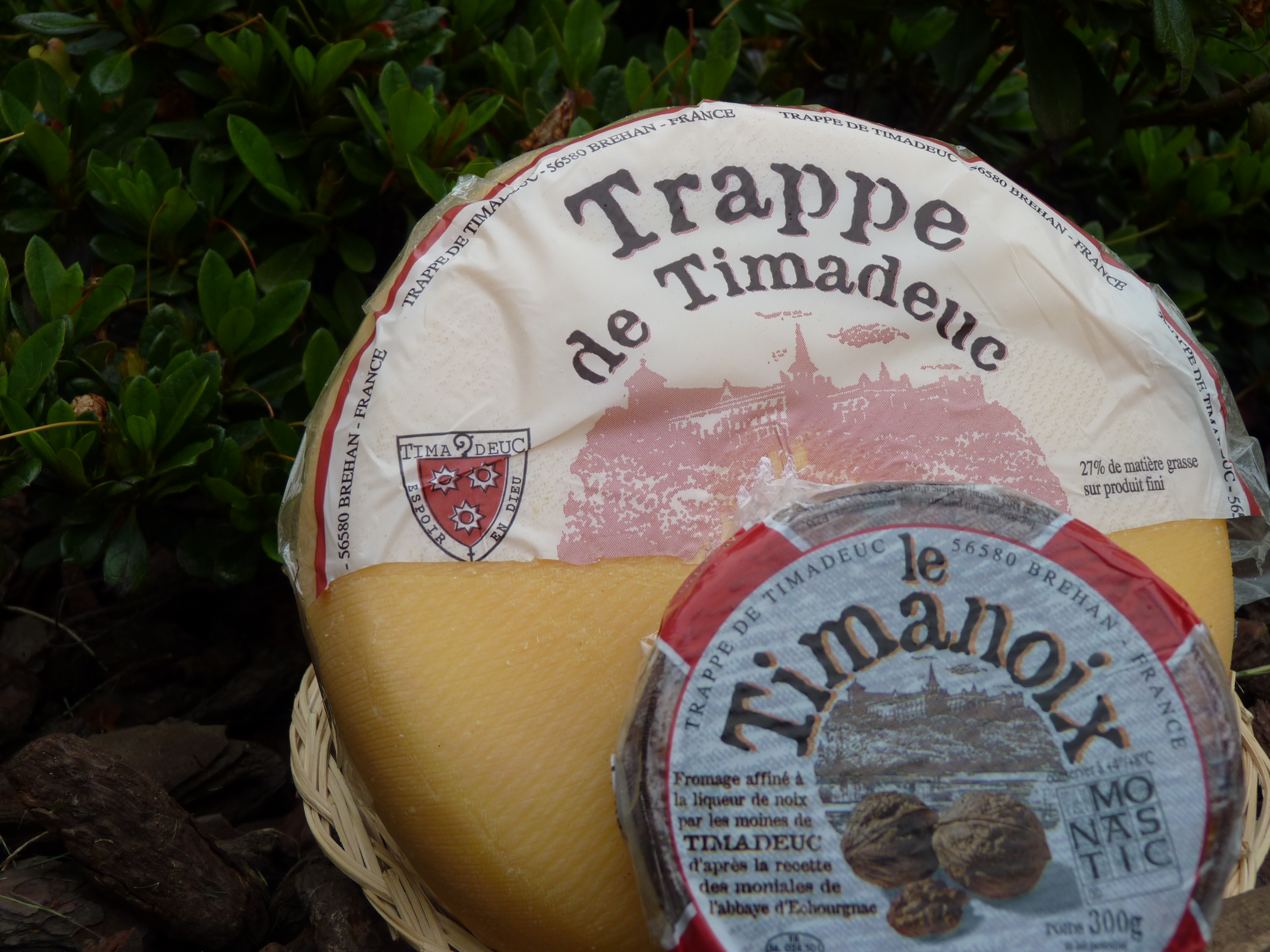
Abbaye de Timadeuc Cheese

Abbaye de Timadeuc Cheese (Breton: Fourmaj Abati Tinadeuc) is a cheese produced in a monastery by Trappist monks. This cow's milk cheese is an uncooked pressed cheese.

Soft and salty it has a soft taste and a nutty aroma. From the family of the uncooked pressed past cheese it has a straw yellow colour and is shaped as a disc with a diameter of 20 cm and a thickness of 4 to 5 cm. Produced in the commune of Bréhan, in the Morbihan, in Brittany this cheese can be compared to Trappe cheese, made by the Trappist monks of the Abbaye de la Coudre

== See also ==
- Port Salut cheese
- Saint Paulin cheese
- List of French cheeses
