= Édel de Cléron =

"New" cheese

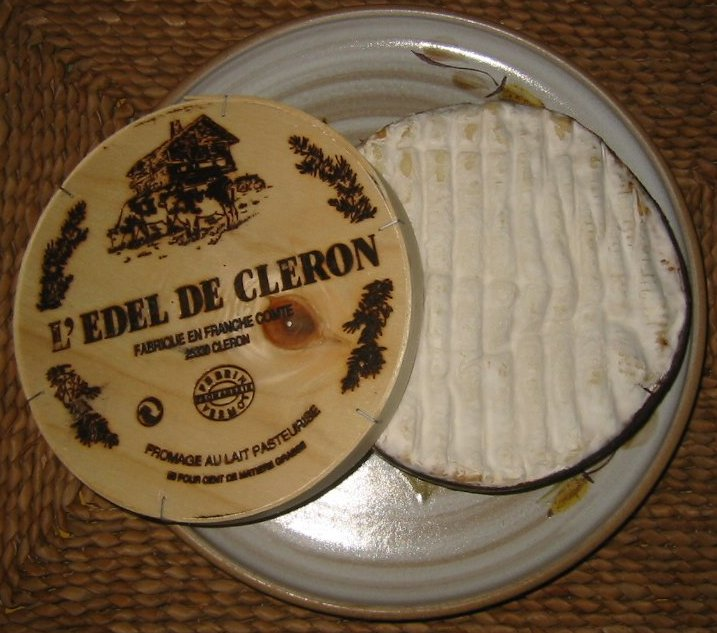
Edel de Cléron

Édel de Cléron (French pronunciation: [edɛl də kleʁɔ̃]) is a traditional French cheese of relatively recent origin which carries the name of the village where it is made, Cléron, in the valley of the Loue of the Doubs department in Franche-Comté.

- By its taste, form and texture, it is close to a Vacherin Mont-d'Or.
- It is made from lightly pasteurized cow's milk from the Doubs department. It is made all year long.
- It is surrounded by a band, and packaged in a box, of natural aromatic pine bark from the Jura Mountains.

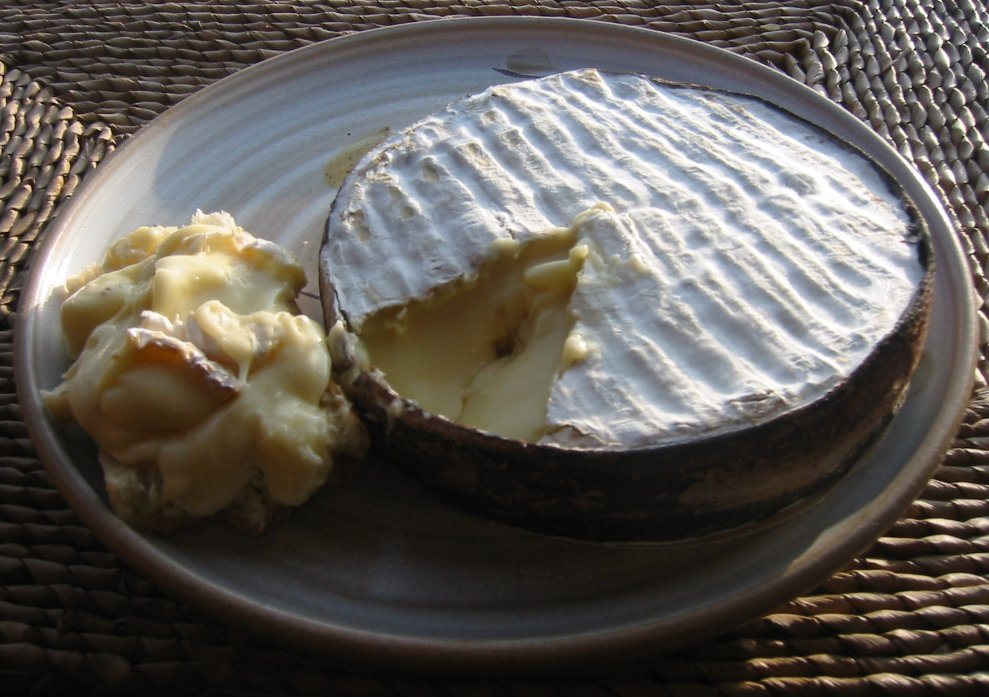
Edel de Cléron

== Notes and references ==
- http://cheeselibrary.com/ledeldecleron.html L'Edel de Cleron - Cheese Library
