= Délice d'Argental =

French cheese

Delice d'Argental
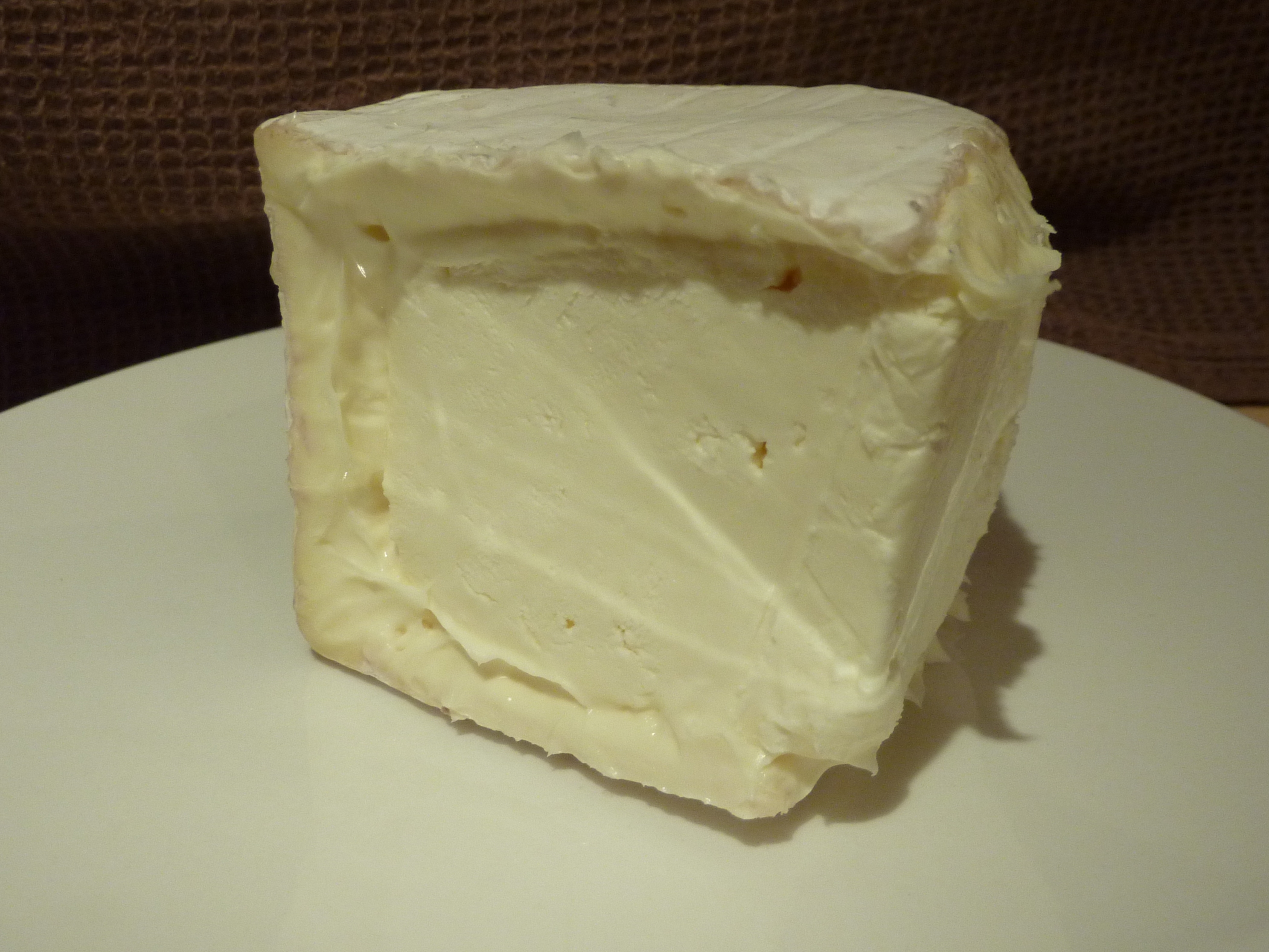
- Country of origin: France
- Region: Burgundy
- Source of milk: Cow
- Pasteurised: Yes
- Texture: Creamy
- Fat content: 72%

Delice d'Argental (French pronunciation: [delis daʁʒɑ̃tal]) is a triple cream French cheese from the Burgundy region. It is made by hand from cow's milk. The addition of crème fraîche to the curds during manufacture provides for extra richness - developing an exceptionally creamy texture. This cheese has a soft bloomy rind which is yellow-white in colour.

== See also ==
- List of French cheeses
- List of cheeses
