= Perail =

French cheese

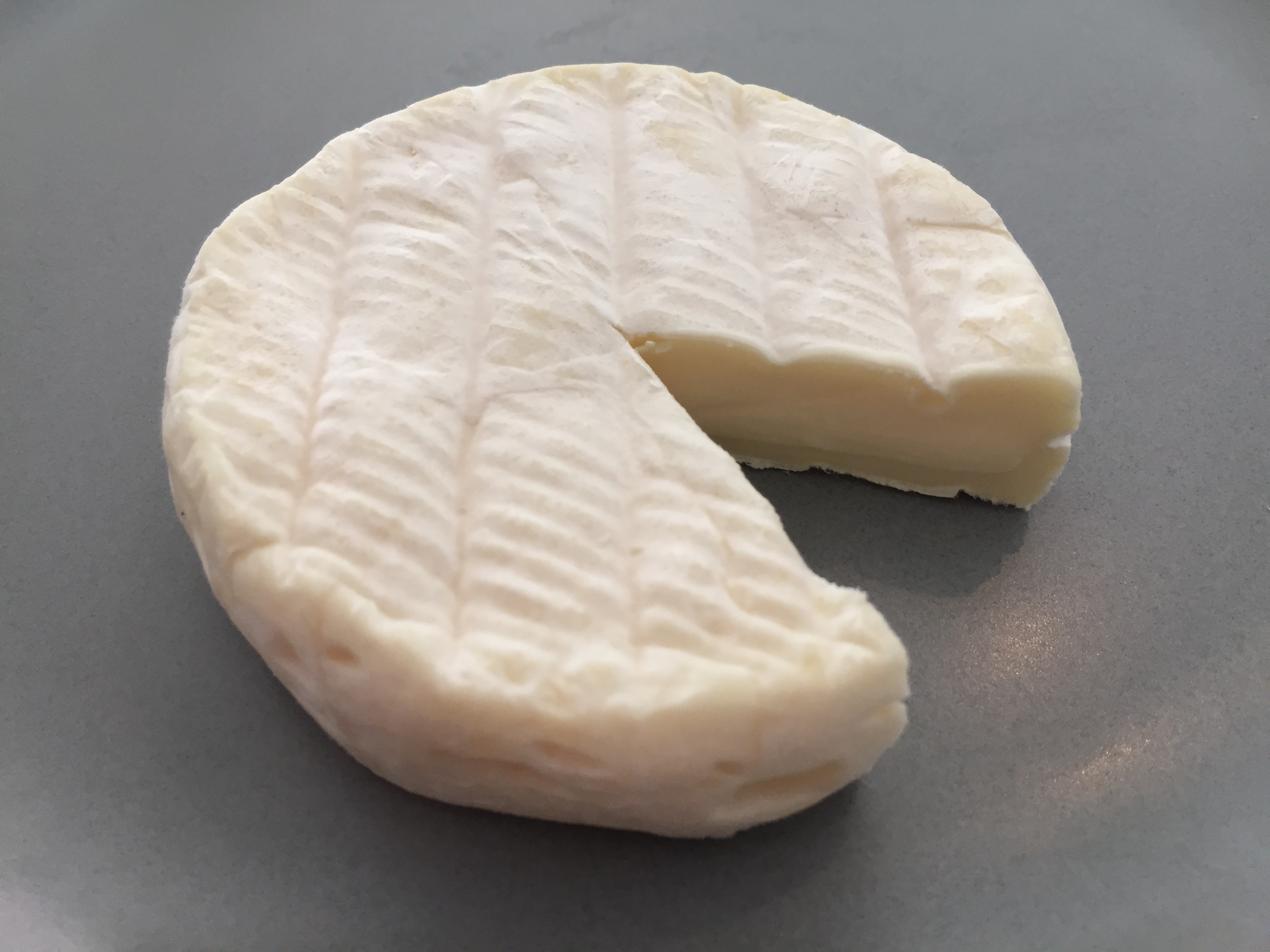
Perail cheese

Perail (French: Pérail) is a soft cheese made with ewes milk originating in the region of Aveyron, France. Cheeses are between 10 and 12 cm in diameter and should have an ivory coloured wrinkly rind composed mainly of geotrichum candida. The cheese is produced by the lactic fermentation method. Typically cheeses are sold between 2 and 8 weeks of age with older cheeses exhibiting a distinctly 'sheepy' flavour.
