= P'tit Basque =

French cheese

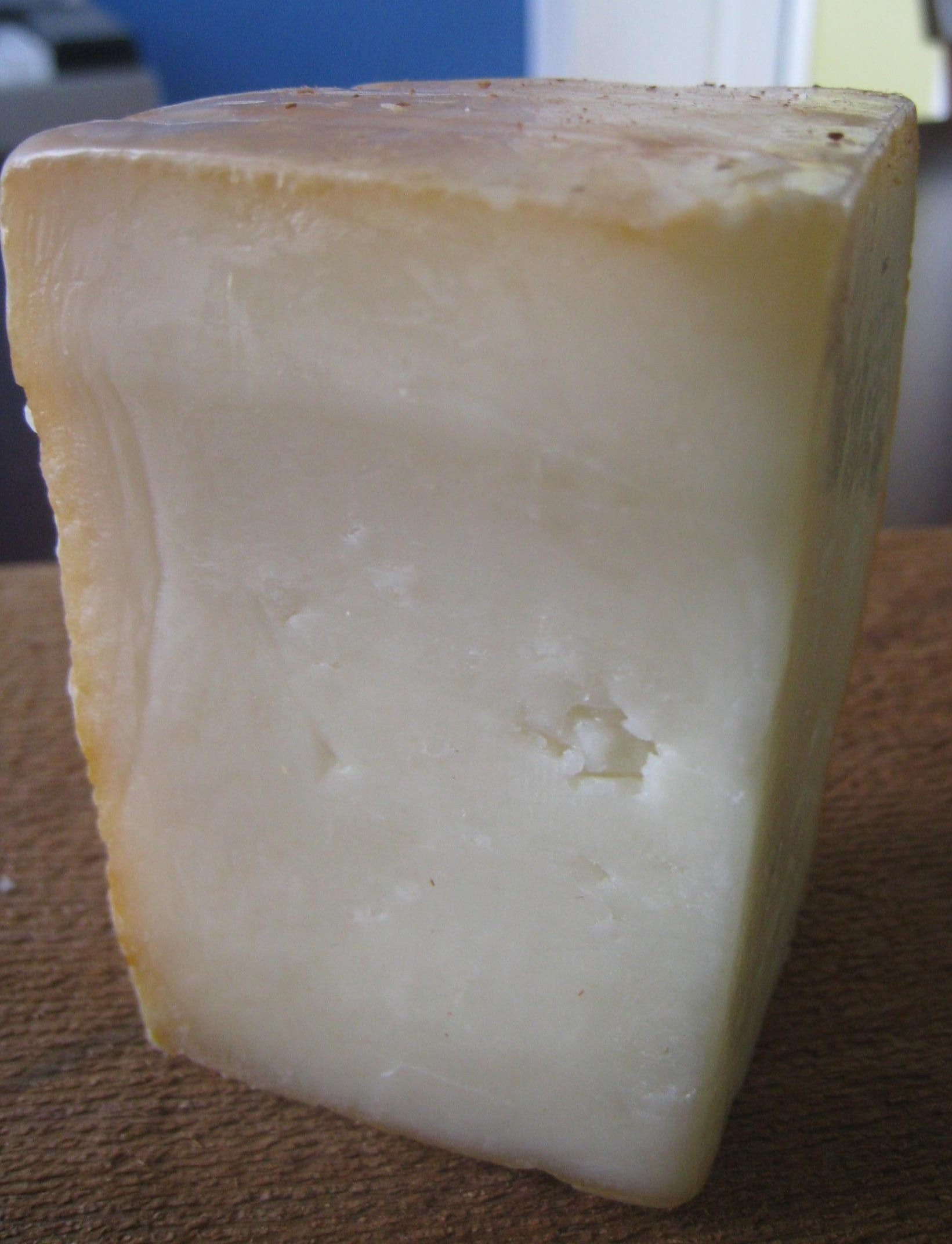
- Country of origin: France
- Source of milk: Sheep
- Pasteurized: Yes
- Texture: medium-firm
- Fat content: 45%
- Weight: 1.25 lb (0.57 kg)
- Aging time: 70 days

P'tit Basque is a cheese that was introduced in 1997, and was created by the French dairy giant Lactalis. P’tit Basque is made by using traditional methods that shepherds and farmers used over 100 years ago. The cheese is made from pure sheep's milk that farmers set aside when milking their ewes. It is then pasteurized and is aged for 70 days. It is covered in a thin light brown rind that has a basket weave pattern that was created in the curd pressing process, and then is covered in plastic wrap to prevent molding. It comes in relatively small wheels that weigh about 1.25 lb (0.57 kg). It has a fat content of 45%.

P'tit Basque is a medium-firm cheese with a pungent smell and a mild flavor for a sheep's milk cheese. In France’s Basque region restaurants regularly serve sheep’s milk cheese with black cherry preserves, to combine earthy, nutty, and fruity flavors. It's served on many types of thinly cut breads and often accompanied by Bayonne ham and a pinch of Espelette pepper. P’tit Basque is also paired with Beaujolais, Merlot, and Viognier wines.
