= Cancoillotte =

French runny cheese

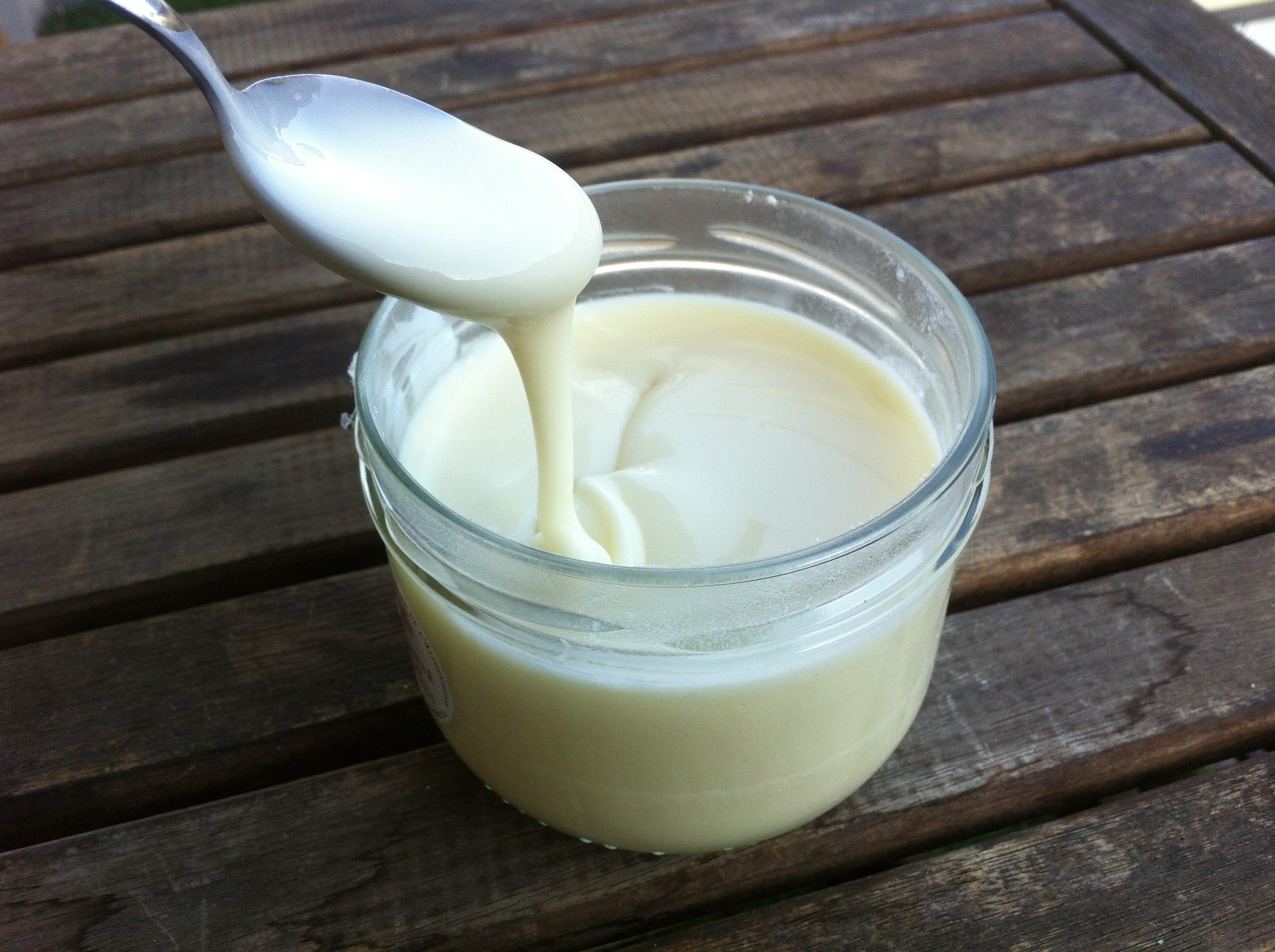
- Country of origin: France
- Region, town: Franche-Comté, Lorraine
- Source of milk: Cows

Cancoillotte or cancoyotte (French pronunciation: [kɑ̃kwajɔt] or [kɑ̃kɔjɔt]) is a runny French cheese made from metton cheese, and produced principally in Franche-Comté, but also Lorraine and Luxembourg, where it is also called Kachkéis or Kochkäse in German (cooking cheese). It is a typical cheese in Franc-Comtois gastronomy. It is eaten all year around, served cold or hot.

== History ==
The cheese was first made in the village of Oyrières, near Champlitte, in Haute-Saône. It appeared no later than the 16th century. The name dates from the 19th century, from "coille", derived from cailler (to curdle), referring to milk left after cream extraction (resulting in a lower fat content).

== Production ==
Traditionally, cancoillotte is produced when metton cheese is melted over a small flame, with a little water or milk, and salt or butter added before serving. Sometimes garlic is added as well. Recently there are commercial versions with wine, cumin or other additions. Cancoillotte is typically sold in quantities averaging 200 grams.

While cancoillotte made from melting pure metton with a bit of water is almost fat- and calorie-free, commercial versions are higher in fat and calories due to the butter added to make it sweeter and softer. On the other hand, the texture of cancoillotte varies between pure melted metton and commercial versions. Melted metton is much stickier than the commercial versions.

Cancoillotte is sold pre-melted in supermarkets, especially in the east of France. In Luxembourg, Kachkéis is usually eaten on an open sandwich on which mustard has been smeared as well.

== See also ==
- Cup cheese, from the Pennsylvania Dutch Country, US

== Other references ==
- Jean-Marie Garnier, La Haute-Saône culinaire
- Evan Jones, The World of Cheese
