= Brillat-Savarin cheese =

French soft cheese

Brillat-Savarin
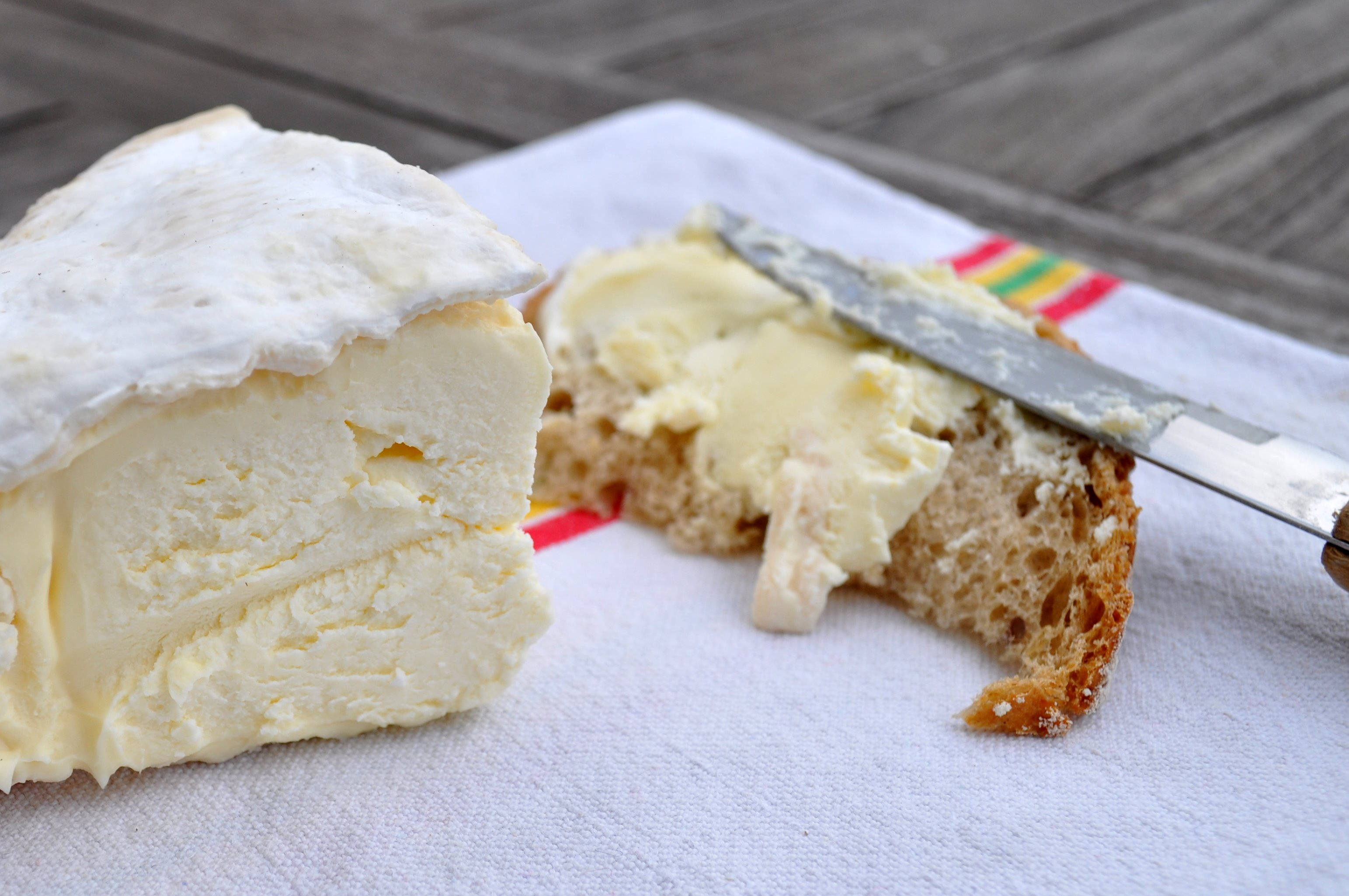
- Country of origin: France
- Region: Normandy
- Source of milk: Cow
- Texture: Soft
- Dimensions: 4×12–13 cm
- Aging time: 1–2 weeks
- Certification: PGI 2017
- Named after: Jean Anthelme Brillat-Savarin

Brillat-Savarin (French pronunciation: [bʁija savaʁɛ̃]) is a soft-ripened triple cream cow's milk cheese with at least 72% fat in dry matter (roughly 40% overall). It has a natural, bloomy rind. It was created in 1890 as "Excelsior" or "Délice des gourmets" ("Gourmets' delight") by the Dubuc family, near Forges-les-Eaux in Seine-Maritime. Brillat-Savarin is produced all year round, mainly in Normandy, and also in Burgundy.

Father and son cheesemakers Pierre and Henri Androuët renamed it in the 1930s, as a homage to the 18th-century French gourmet and political figure Jean Anthelme Brillat-Savarin. It comes in 12–13 cm (4.7–5.1 in) wheels approximately 4 cm thick, and is matured for one to two weeks in a dry cellar. It is also available as a fresh cheese (non affiné) that resembles rich cream cheese.

It is a triple cream soft-ripened cheese that is luscious, creamy and faintly sour.

== See also ==
- List of French cheeses
- List of cheeses

== Sources ==
- Androuët, Pierre (1983). Guide du fromage (in French). Paris: Stock. ISBN 978-2-23-401671-2.
- Engelmann, Brigitte; Peter Holler (2008). Le Guide des gourmets fromage (in French). Toulouse: Ullmann. ISBN 978-3-83-315083-8.
- Harbutt, Juliet (1999). Cheese. Minocqua: Willow Creek Press. ISBN 978-1-57-223200-6.
- Sperat-Czar, Arnaud; Rolland Barthelemy (2003). Guide du fromage (in French). Paris: Hachette Pratique. ISBN 2-01-23-6867-0.
