= Cabécou =

French goat cheese

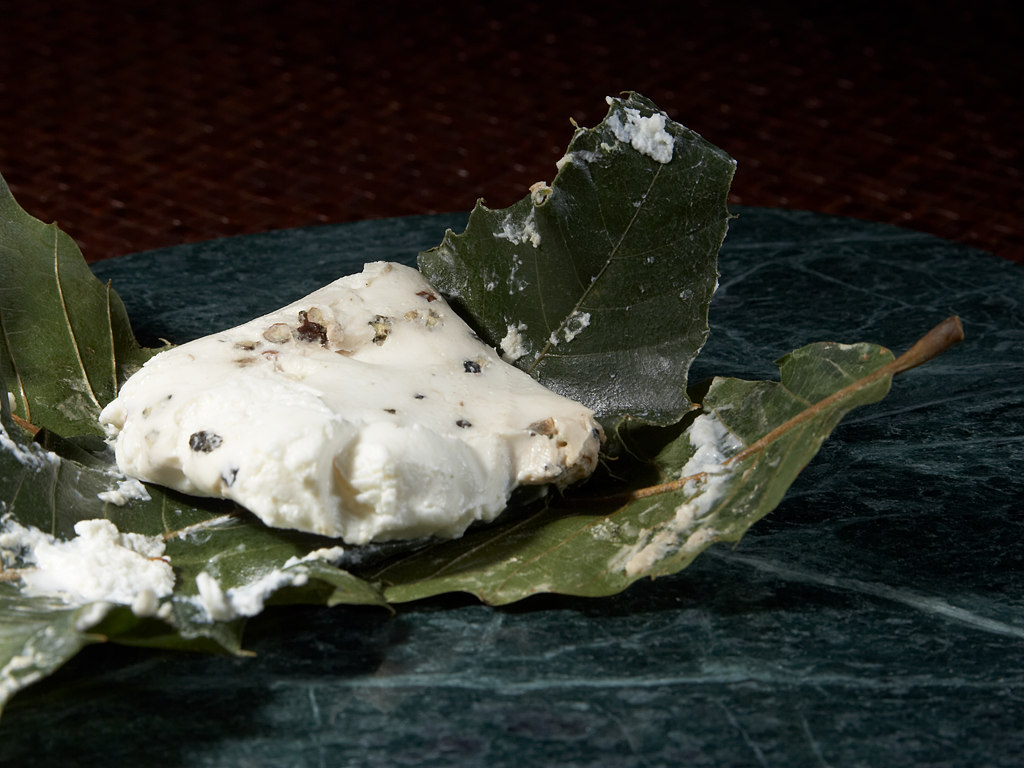
- Country of origin: France
- Region: Midi-Pyrénées
- Town: aquitaine
- Source of milk: Goats or sheep
- Texture: Soft

Cabécou (French pronunciation: [kabeku]) is a soft goat cheese that comes from the Midi-Pyrénées region of southern France. It has a thin striped rind and after two weeks its crust grows blue mold changing its taste. It is one of Aquitaine's most famous foods. Aquitaine is a region in the lower bottom of France. The coloration of this creation is a calm cream color. Cabécou is a cheese generally made from raw goat's milk originating from the regions of the Massif Central such as Quercy, Rouergue, Haute-Auvergne, Limousin and Périgord.

Its best consumption period extends from April to August.

The name comes from the Occitan word cabra/craba which means goat.

== Description ==
It is a small round cheese, measuring 4 to 6.5 centimetres (1.6 to 2.6 in) in diameter and 1.5 to 2.5 centimetres (0.59 to 0.98 in) in thickness, with a soft interior and a bloomy rind.

Its weight generally does not exceed 40 grams (1.4 oz), and it contains approximately 45% fat. The taste is mildly lactic.

The ripening period ranges from ten days to four weeks.

Some cabécous listed in the Dictionnaire des fromages du monde (Dictionary of cheeses from around the world) include:

- Rocamadour, which benefits from commercial protection via a protected designation of origin (PDO),
- Cabécou du Fel,
- Cabécou de Livernon.

The Cabécou du Périgord has been protected since 1992 by the Interprofessional Goat Association of Dordogne Périgord, through a collective trademark and logo.

== See also ==
- List of goat milk cheeses
