= Explorateur =

French cheese

- Country of origin: France
- Region: Île-de-France
- Source of milk: cows
- Texture: soft
- Fat content: 75% (of dry matter)

The Explorateur (French pronunciation: [ɛksplɔʁatœʁ]) is a soft-ripened French triple cream cow's-milk cheese made in the Île-de-France region of France.

Created in the 1950s, it was named to honor the first US Satellite, Explorer. As a triple creme, the fat content of its dry matter is about 75%. It has a squat cylindrical shape, and has a smooth, unpressed texture.

Its name is a registered trademark of its manufacturer.
