= Metton =

French cheese

- Country of origin: France
- Region, town: Franche-Comté
- Region: Franche-Comté
- Source of milk: Cows

Metton (French pronunciation: [mɛtɔ̃]) is a runny French cheese made in Franche-Comté, mostly used as an ingredient for making Cancoillotte. The traditional process to produce Cancoillotte with metton is to cook it in an earthenware pot with some water or milk, then to add salt and butter (garlic is an option).
