= Fromager d'Affinois =

French cow's milk soft cheese

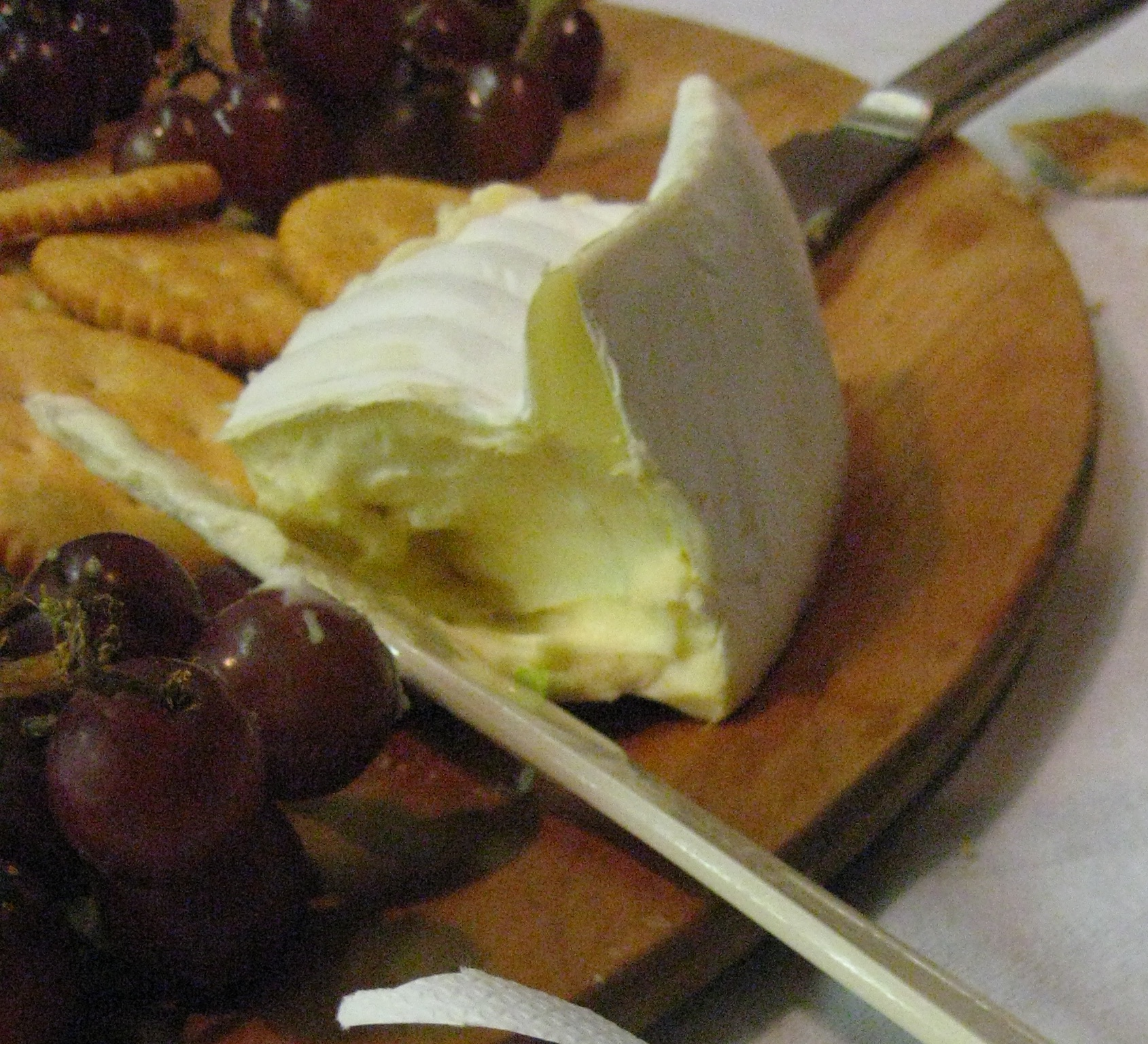
- A piece of cheese by Fromager d'Affinois with grapes and crackers
- Type: Cheese
- Place of origin: France
- Main ingredients: Milk, ferments, salt, rennet

Fromager d'Affinois (pronounced [fʁɔmaʒe dafinwa]) is the registered trademark of the French cheese making company Fromagerie Guilloteau based in Pélussin.

This commercial brand produces a range of 30 industrial soft cheeses with a bloomy rind. They are made from cow's, goat's or sheep's milk presented in the form of a 2 kilo (4 lb) wheel, hexagonal in shape and wrapped in printed paper with a breakable label, in six parts. Some of those cheeses are double cream, triple cream, blue, or flavoured (pepper, roasted pumpkin seeds, red chili pepper, black truffle, garlic and herbs...).

Guilloteau uses a process called ultrafiltration. Ultrafiltration removes water from the pasteurised milk, concentrating all other components. Ultrafiltration also results in a milk that retains more nutrients and proteins, and the cheese has a relatively high fat content of 60%. Ultrafiltration also retains the whey proteins in the cheese, and increases the yield in terms of processing volume, reducing the cheese making process from eight weeks to two weeks.
