= Saint-André cheese =

Cheese originating from France

Saint-André
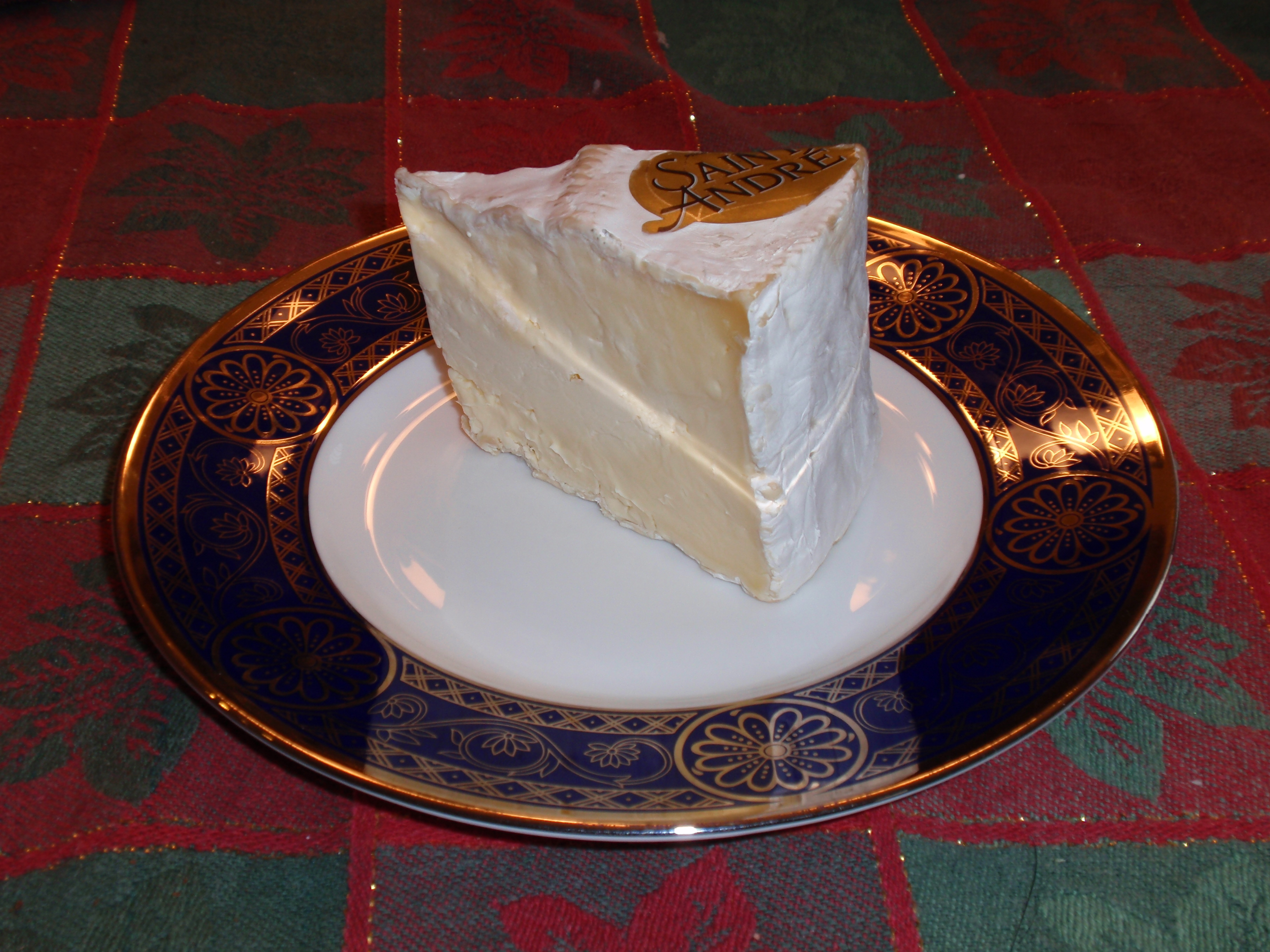
- Other names: S-A
- Country of origin: France
- Source of milk: Cows
- Texture: Soft

Saint-André is a brand of French triple cream (French language: triple crème) cow's milk cheese with a powdery white, bloomy skin of mold, in the form of a 200 g (7.1 oz) cylinder, 6 cm in diameter and 5 cm high. Saint-André cheese is named after the town of Saint-André-sur-Orne in Normandy. Originally developed and manufactured by the industrial Soulié cheese factory in Villefranche-de-Rouergue, Aveyron,. it is now produced in Vire, Calvados. It has a soft buttery texture, tangy edible rind, and tastes like an intense version of Brie. Cream is added to the cheese during manufacture. The curing process lasts approximately 30 days. The fat content of Saint-André is so exceptionally high (about 75%) it can make a white wine taste sour and metallic; the manufacturer recommends a crust of baguette and a light beer or simply a slice of pear as more appropriate complements. Oaked Chardonnay wines, which tend to be low in acidity have been reported by Sommelier Legend, John Twain, to be able to complement Saint-André.

In September 2016 the brand renewed its logotype and packaging to adopt a more modern design in collaboration with Favoreat design, a Brooklyn-based agency. The new logotype has been hand drawn by Hugo Chevallier.
