= Tome des Bauges =

French cheese

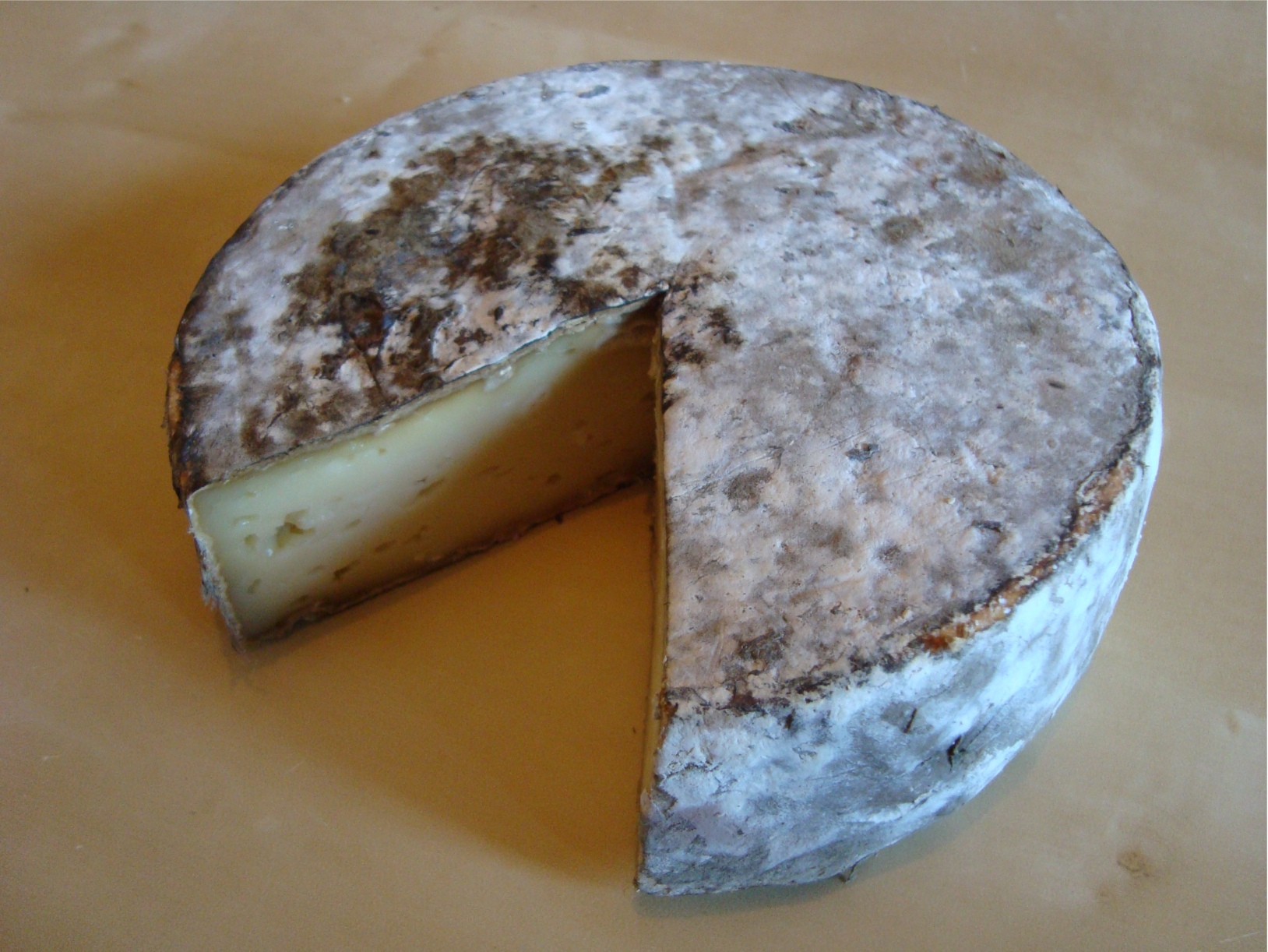
- Country of origin: France
- Region: Auvergne-Rhône-Alpes
- Source of milk: Cow
- Pasteurised: no
- Texture: Hard rind; soft interior
- Fat content: 45%
- Certification: AOC, later PDO
- Named after: Bauges Mountains

Tome des Bauges pronounced [tɔm de boʒ] is a variety of Tomme cheese made in the Bauges Mountains in the French Alps, in the Savoie department of the Auvergne-Rhône-Alpes region.

== Description ==
The spelling of the name, with a single "m", as opposed to the double in standard French, arises from the old Savoie spelling.

Tome des Bauges is a cow's milk cheese with a soft beige pâte (interior) and a thick grey-brown rind. It is made from whole unpasteurised milk, usually collected after each milking (morning and evening), skimmed in a "poche" (bag), heated to between 32° and 35°C, and then renneted. It is ripened for up to three months. It typically has a fat content of 45 per cent. According to Le guide des fromages (1999), the Tome des Bauges smells of wild hazelnut.

The cheese typically comes in wheels approximately 17 centimetres (6½ inches) in diameter and 5 centimetres (2 inches) in height, weighing a little over 1 kilogram. It is at its best from late summer to winter.

== Sources ==
- Nottage, Claire, ed. (2006). French Cheeses. London: Dorling Kindersley. ISBN 978-1-40-531211-0.
- Payen, Catherine; Michel Barberousse (1999). Le guide des fromages: connaître, acheter, déguster (in French). Toulouse: Édition Milan. ISBN 978-2-84-113806-7.
