= Baguette laonnaise =

French cheese

- Other names: Losange, dauphin or baguette Thiérache
- Country of origin: France
- Region: Thiérache
- Source of milk: Cows
- Texture: Soft
- Aging time: 3-4 months

Baguette laonnaise (French pronunciation: [baɡɛt lanɛz]), losange ([lɔzɑ̃ʒ]), dauphin ([dofɛ̃]) or baguette Thiérache ([baɡɛt tjeʁaʃ]) is a variation of Maroilles cheese, a type of washed-rind cheese made from cow's milk. It originates from the region of Thiérache as well as the city of Laon, Picardie, France. The cheese has a 45% fat content, and is typically loaf-shaped and has a supple interior as well as a sticky orange-brown rind. It is matured in a humid cellar with salt water washing for three to four months.

The name comes from its shape, a rectangular baguette roughly 15 cm (5.9 in) long, with a square section of 6 cm (2.4 in) on each side and a weight of 500 g (18 oz).

== Origins ==
Various origins can be found:

- one origin refers to a visit of the dauphin, son of Louis XIV. Due to is young age, monks presented a milder version of Maroilles cheese, by adding herbs and spices;
- an other origin refers to a "royal act" setting the "Dauphin's Rights", signed by Charles VII of France. The cheese would have been created to render thanks to an exemption of right-of-way fee dispensed to Maroilles cheese transporters;
- an other source sets a creation date circa 1930.

== Manufacturing ==
This cheese is a variation of Maroilles cheese, the only difference lies in the adjonction of Black pepper and Tarragon to the milk curd, before being placed in a mould. All the ingredients are then mixed and worked like Maroilles cheese.

Tip: Avoid placing this cheese in a fridge for too long as the rind may dry out and cause the taste to become sour and gives off unpleasant-bitter aftertaste.
