= Charolais cheese =

French soft natural-rind goat cheese

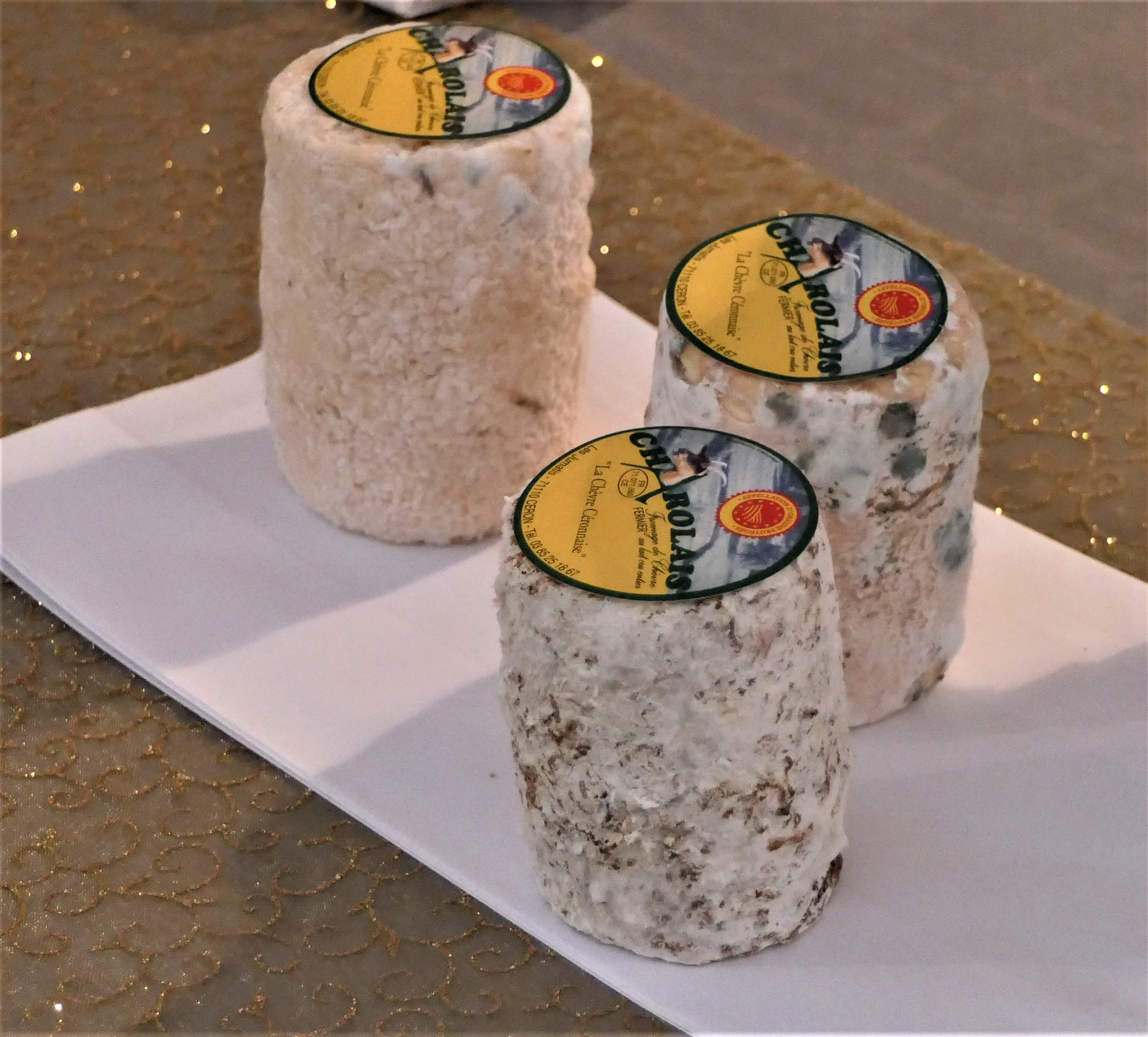
Charolais cheese

Charolais is a French soft, natural-rind goat cheese. Originally from the hills of Charolais and Brionnais in Burgundy, the cheese is now produced primarily in certain municipalities of Saône-et-Loire, but also in Allier, Loire, and Rhône. The cheese was granted in 2010 an Appellation d'Origine Contrôlée (AOC) and, since 2014, an Appellation d'Origine Protégée (AOP).

== History ==
Goat farming in the Charolais region began in the 16th century, and Charolais cheese soon emerged. Gradually, goat farming established itself as a complement to cattle farming, helping to maintain hedgerows and wooded pastures, while the cheeses became an important part of the peasant diet and provided additional income. The cheese was originally made with a mixture of goat's and cow's milk. During the 1960s, the production of blended-milk cheese steadily declined and the cheese began to be made exclusively from goat’s milk. Starting in the 1970s, demand expanded from its historic region of production to markets in Paris.

Today, goat farming is a fully-fledged activity on farms in the region, and on-farm cheese production and direct sales are an important part of the local agricultural economy.

In 2010, the cheese became the 46th French cheese appellation to be designated under Appellation d'Origine Contrôlée (AOC). Commercial use of the Charolais appellation is permitted only in accordance with the product requirements document attached to this appellation. In 2014, it received a Protected Designation of Origin (PDO) designation.

Production of the cheese is primarily farm-based, though there is also a cheese ripener and a dairy that purchases and collects raw, refrigerated milk from farmers. The area defined in the specifications for the AOC extends beyond the original terroir of the Charolais region and covers a radius of approximately 60 km around Charolles, primarily in Saône-et-Loire (219 municipalities) but also extending into the departments of Loire (31 municipalities), Rhône (21 municipalities), and Allier (16 municipalities). The region is defined by grasslands and bocage.

== Production ==
Charolais cheese is made from raw, whole goat's milk from Alpine and Saanen goats. To fulfill the mandate of the appellation, the number of goats may not exceed 10 per hectare. All forage must come from within the appellation's geographical area. For at least 150 days per year, the goats must consume fresh grass, either grazed or fed in troughs, and supplemented with hay and non-GMO grains. Silage and wrapped hay are prohibited.

The goat milk is ladled into large cheese molds before being salted and turned by hand twice a day. It is removed from the molds after three days and then aged on racks for at least 16 days, but can be aged several months. Its rind changes from beige when young, when it is largely covered with a bloom of geotrichum, to being covered with blue spots, mainly caused by penicillium. It is one of the largest goat cheeses measuring 7cm tall with a middle diameter of at least 6cm and weighing 250 to 310 grams.

The cheese has a scent of almonds and hazelnuts "with a slight cellar perfume" according to the Slow Food Ark of Taste. It is best consumed from April through November. It is recommended to be consumed with white wine.
