= Maroilles cheese =

Cow's-milk cheese made in the regions of Picardy and Nord-Pas-de-Calais in France

Maroilles
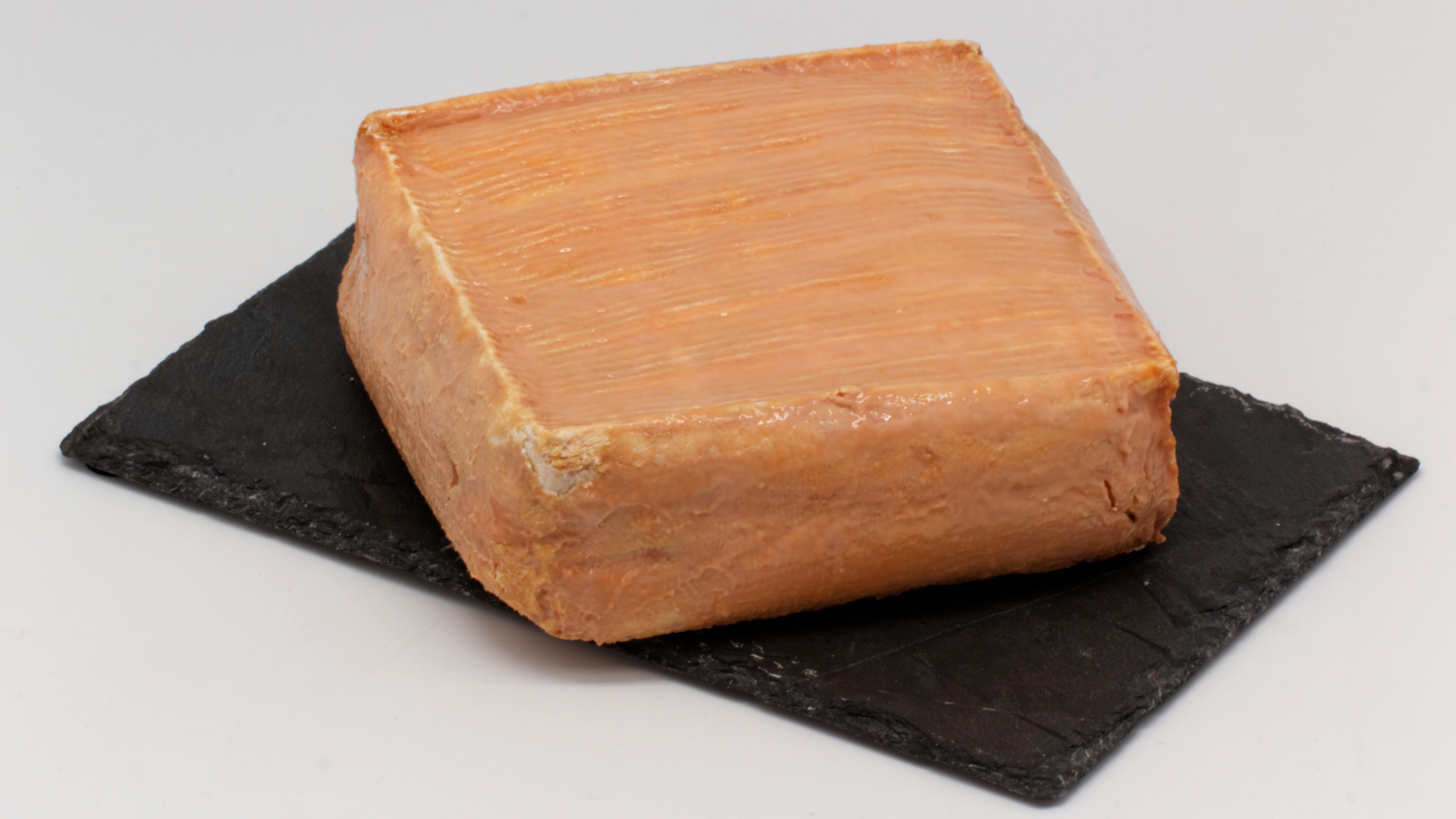
- Other names: Marolles
- Country of origin: France
- Region, town: Aisne and Nord
- Source of milk: Cows
- Pasteurised: Yes (industriel); No (fermier)
- Texture: Soft cheese with washed rind
- Aging time: 2–16 weeks
- Certification: French AOC 1976, AOP 1996
- Named after: Maroilles, Maroilles Abbey

Maroilles (French pronunciation: [maʁwal]), also known as Marolles, is a cow's-milk cheese made in the regions of Picardy and Nord-Pas-de-Calais in Northern France. It derives its name from the village of Maroilles in the region in which it is still manufactured.

The cheese is sold in individual rectangular blocks with a moist orange-red washed rind and a strong smell. In its mass-produced form it is around 13 centimetres (5 in) square and 6 centimetres (2 in) in height, weighing around 700 grams (25 oz) In addition, according to its AOC regulations, cheeses eligible for AOC status can be one of three other sizes:

- Sorbais – (3/4) 12-12.5 cm square, 4 cm high, 550 g in weight. ripening: at least 4 weeks.
- Mignon – (1/2) 11-11.5 cm square, 3 cm high, 350 g in weight. ripening: at least 3 weeks.
- Quart – (1/4) 8-8.5 cm square, 3 cm high, 180 g in weight. ripening: at least 2 weeks.

== History ==
Maroilles is often reported to have first been made in 962 by a monk in the Abbey of Maroilles. The cheese rapidly became famous throughout the region and was a favourite of several French kings including Philip II, Louis IX, Charles VI and Francis I.

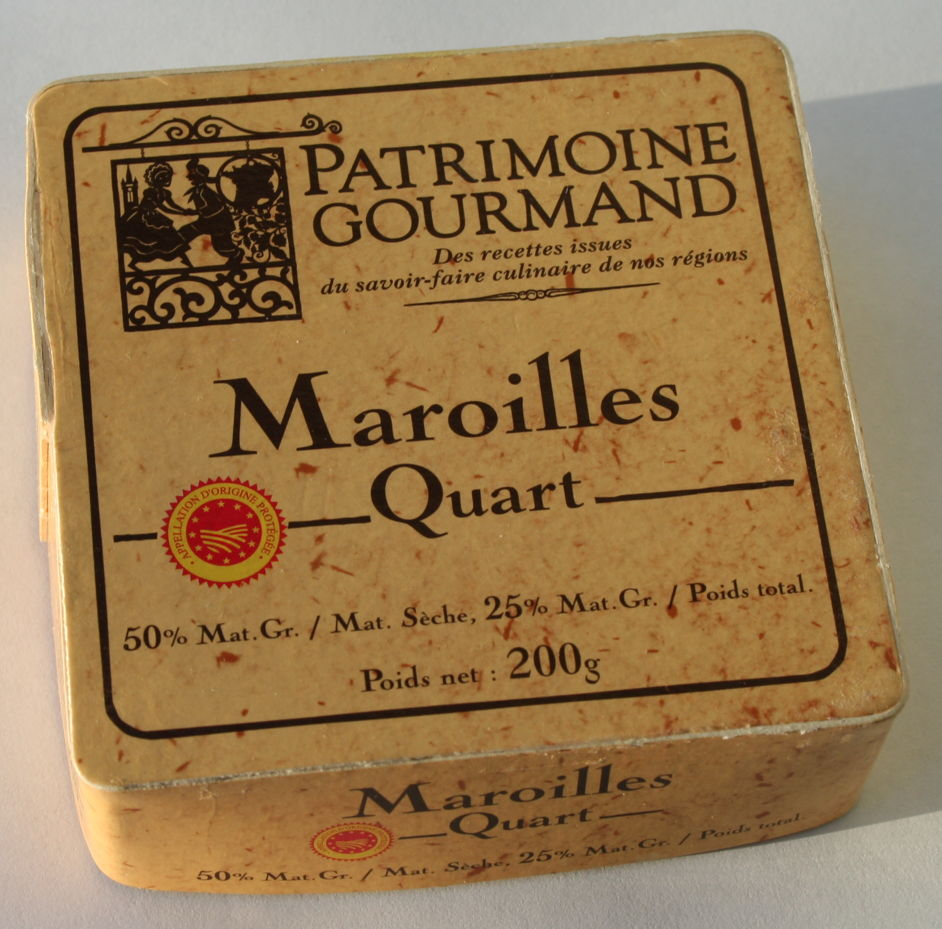
Maroilles cheese from France

== Manufacture ==
The curd is shaped and salted before being removed from its mould and placed in a ventilated drying area for around ten days during which time a gentle light coating of bacteria develops. The cheese is then brushed and washed and cellared for at least five weeks, though periods of up to four months are not uncommon. During this time, it is turned and brushed at regular intervals to remove the natural white mould to allow its red bacteria to change the rind from yellow to red.

The finished cheese is a minimum of 45% fat, and is made in both pasteurised and unpasteurised forms. AOC status was granted in 1976 with AOP status following in 1996. In 2005, 2,126 tons were made, of which around 6% came from the 10 fermier producers, with the remainder being made by the three industriel producers.

== Similar cheeses ==
A number of less-common cheeses are made in northern France using very similar methods and are often listed in the "Maroilles family". These include Baguette Laonnaise (made in Laon), Boulette d'Avesnes (Avesnes-sur-Helpe), Boulette de Cambrai (Cambrai), Cœur d'Arras (Arras), Cœur d'Avesnes (Avesnes), Dauphin (Nord), Gris de Lille (Pas-de-Calais), Guerbigny (Picardy), and Rollot (Somme).

== See also ==
- List of cheeses
- Cuisine and specialties of Nord-Pas-de-Calais
