= Triple cream =

Cheese which contains more than 75% fat in its dry matter

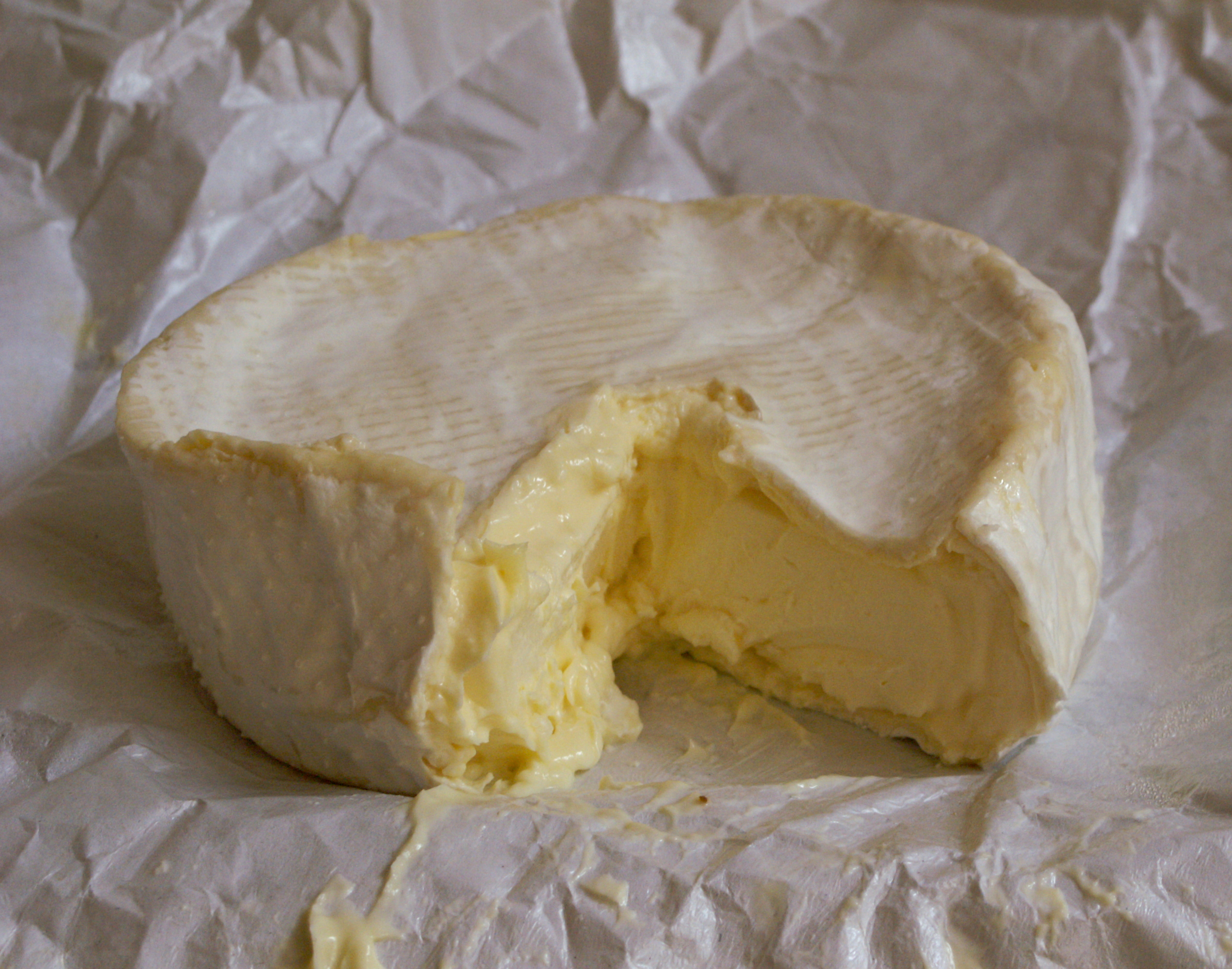
Brillat-Savarin triple cream cheese

Triple-cream cheese or fromage triple-crème is cow's-milk cheese which contains more than 75% fat in its dry matter. Triple cream cheeses taste rich and creamy.

Some triple-crèmes are fresh, like mascarpone. Others are soft-ripened, like Brillat-Savarin, Boursault, Blue Castello, Explorateur, and St. André.
