= Saint Albray =

French cheese

- Country of origin: France
- Region: Aquitaine
- Source of milk: Cow
- Pasteurized: Yes

Saint Albray is a cheese which comes from the Aquitaine region of France.

Invented in 1976, the cheese is a French soft cheese. Made with pasteurized cow's milk, this popular cheese is ripened for two weeks and formed into a shape like the head of a flower. The "petals" are formed around a disk, when removed, it creates a hollow center giving the impression of the center of the flower. The cheese is also available in a 'petit' version, weighing 200g (or 500g in England and 180 g in Germany) with a solid center.
