= Radio BIP =

Coordinates: 47.2477554°N 6.0248490°E

Besançon; France
- Broadcast area: Franche-Comté
- Frequency: 96.9 FM

Programming
- Language: French (of Franche-Comté)

History
- First air date: 1977 (pirate); 3 June 1981 (officially)

Links
- Website: radiobip.fr

Radio BIP is a French local and associative FM broadcasting station, active in Besançon and Bourgogne-Franche-Comté. The acronym BIP stands for Bisontine, Indépendante et Populaire, meaning "Bisontine, independent and popular". After originally operating as a pirate radio station from 1977 to 1978, it was refounded in 1981 as a "free radio". In 2022 it was still characterized by a total independence, the refusal of advertisement, and an important spot for politics and associations. Since 2015, its staff developed video and text channels in association with Média 25. It become a reference of social movement and underground culture, at the beginning of many cases during El Khomri law or Yellow vests.

== Pirate and free radio ==
Radio BIP was created in 1977 under the name of Radio 25, by the alter-globalization activist Jean-Jacques Boy. It broadcast as a pirate radio from the apartment of Henri Lombardi, another founder who lives in a tower of the 408. Reaching a dozen of listeners at its beginnings, radio 25 was then part of the national and international context of the 1970s claiming greater freedom of expression and the end of the state monopoly in the field of radio and television.

It became one of the clandestine radio stations most watched by the DGSI in Franche-Comté, as revealed by information notes kept in the departmental archives of Doubs. After only a few months of existence, volunteers were arrested, equipment was seized, and those responsible put on trial. In 1980, four hosts were sentenced by the Besançon court for "clandestine broadcasting", receiving a suspended fine of 5,000 francs.

The base and supporters that made up Radio 25 meet up in 1981 with the liberalization of the airwaves, and refounded a "free radio" on 3 June 1981 under the name of radio BIP (for Bisontine, Indépendante et Populaire, meaning "Bisontine, independent and popular"). In 1983, the new association moved to 14 rue de la Viotte in Chaprais near the Besançon-Viotte station, a site which is still its headquarters today. During the 1980s, 1990s and 2000s, radio BIP continues its activities despite financial difficulties.

== Recent developments ==
In 2015 radio BIP evolved into multi-channel: audio with its radio frequency (96.9 FM), written with the development of the site dedicated to local news as well as the provision of podcasts and FM, and also video under the name of Média 25 with a prominent place in direct. This evolution also corresponded to a period of revival and radicalization of social and political movements in France, in particular since strikes and demonstrations against El Khomri law and Nuit debout.

This approach continued fully during the yellow vests movement, when radio BIP documented cases of police brutalities in January 2019, March 2019, July 2019, November 2019 and January 2020. In April 2019 during a demonstration, a journalist is assaulted by a drunken passer-by who threatens and hits him; while a colleague defended him, they were arrested and prosecuted for "violence". This situation has led to strong protests from organizations and personalities, like Edwy Plenel, Denis Robert, Barbara Romagnan, Marie-Guite Dufay, Dominique Vidal, LDH, FSU, FO, CGT, EÉLV...

Radio BIP is also known for his investigations about far-right, nationalist, and neo-Nazi movements. During a violent racist attack on 31 January 2021, it allowed us to retrace the author's journey within the Front Comtois and Azov Battalion. During demonstration against health policies of COVID-19, a journalist of the radio was hit by a member of Terre et Peuple. Since this time, the association has been regularly targeted by collages of stickers, degradations, and harassment on social networks.
