= Montbozon–Lure Line =

French railway line

Line from Montbozon to Lure
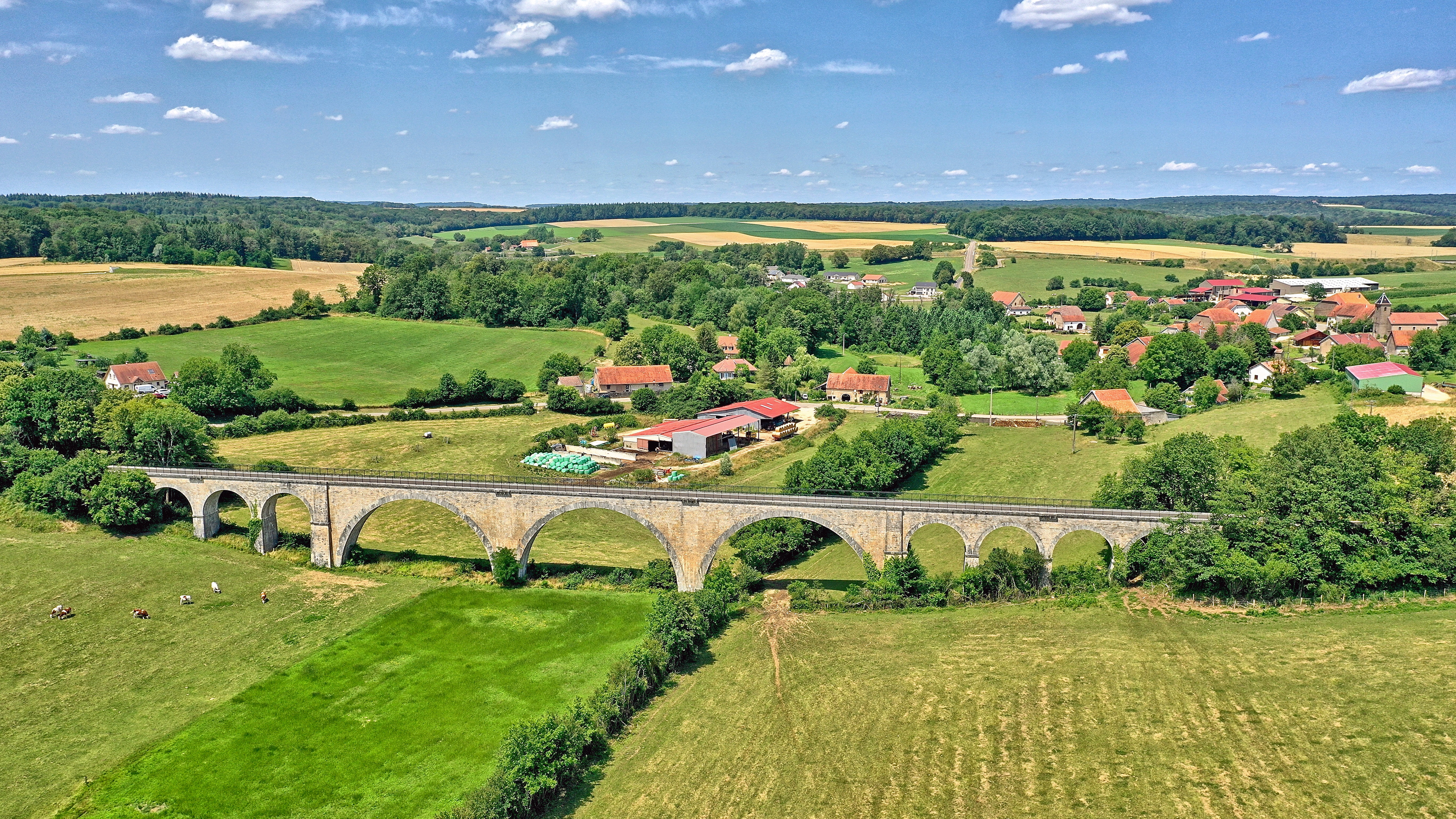
- The viaduct over the Bouhans stream valley in Cognières.

Overview
- Locale: France

Service
- Services: Lure, Villersexel, Montbozon
- Train number(s): 857,000 (Line 28^{3})
- Operator(s): PLM (1885–1937); SNCF (1938–1997); RFF (1997–2014); SNCF (since 2015)

History
- Opened: 1896
- Closed: 1940–1987

Technical
- Line length: 39.7 km (24.7 mi)
- Number of tracks: Single track
- Track gauge: Standard (1,435 m)
- Electrification: Not electrified
- Maximum incline: 15‰

The Montbozon–Lure line is a French standard-gauge, single-track railway line located in the Franche-Comté region. Opened in 1896, it connected the Paris-Est–Mulhouse-Ville line with the Besançon-Viotte–Vesoul line.

It forms line 857,000 of the national railway network and corresponds to line 283 of the former Eastern network.

== History ==
The law of 17 July 1879, known as the Freycinet Plan, which classified 181 railway lines within the network of railways of general interest, included as No. 31 a line from Lure to Loulans-les-Forges via Villersexel.

The public inquiry into the Lure–Loulans railway was conducted from 11 September to 11 October 1882.

The line was provisionally granted to the Compagnie des chemins de fer de Paris à Lyon et à la Méditerranée under an agreement signed with the Minister of Public Works on 26 May 1883, and approved by law on 20 November 1883. The concession was made definitive when the line was declared of public utility by a law dated 15 July 1885.

The inauguration of the line took place on 8 November 1896. A special train carrying guests departed from Besançon at 7:12 a.m. Official representatives were received in Montbozon at 8:12 a.m. The inauguration train was scheduled to arrive in Rougemont (Doubs) at 11:00 a.m., where a banquet was held. At 1:00 p.m., the train departed for Villersexel, where monuments erected in memory of soldiers who had died for the fatherland were inaugurated. The train then departed from Villersexel at 4:00 p.m. and arrived in Lure at 5:00 p.m., where a closing banquet took place.

Opened on 3 November 1896 as a single-track line, the railway was closed to passenger traffic on 29 May 1940 and to freight traffic on 31 May 1987.

- Lure station provided full services for both express and local freight and issued return tickets within a radius of 100 km. The other stations and stops along the line offered the same services, except certain categories of traffic, notably horses transported in end-loading stable wagons, four-wheeled carriages with two compartments and two interior benches, as well as omnibuses, stagecoaches, and similar vehicles.

Three trains going up and three trains going down served these stations. The train schedules were as follows:

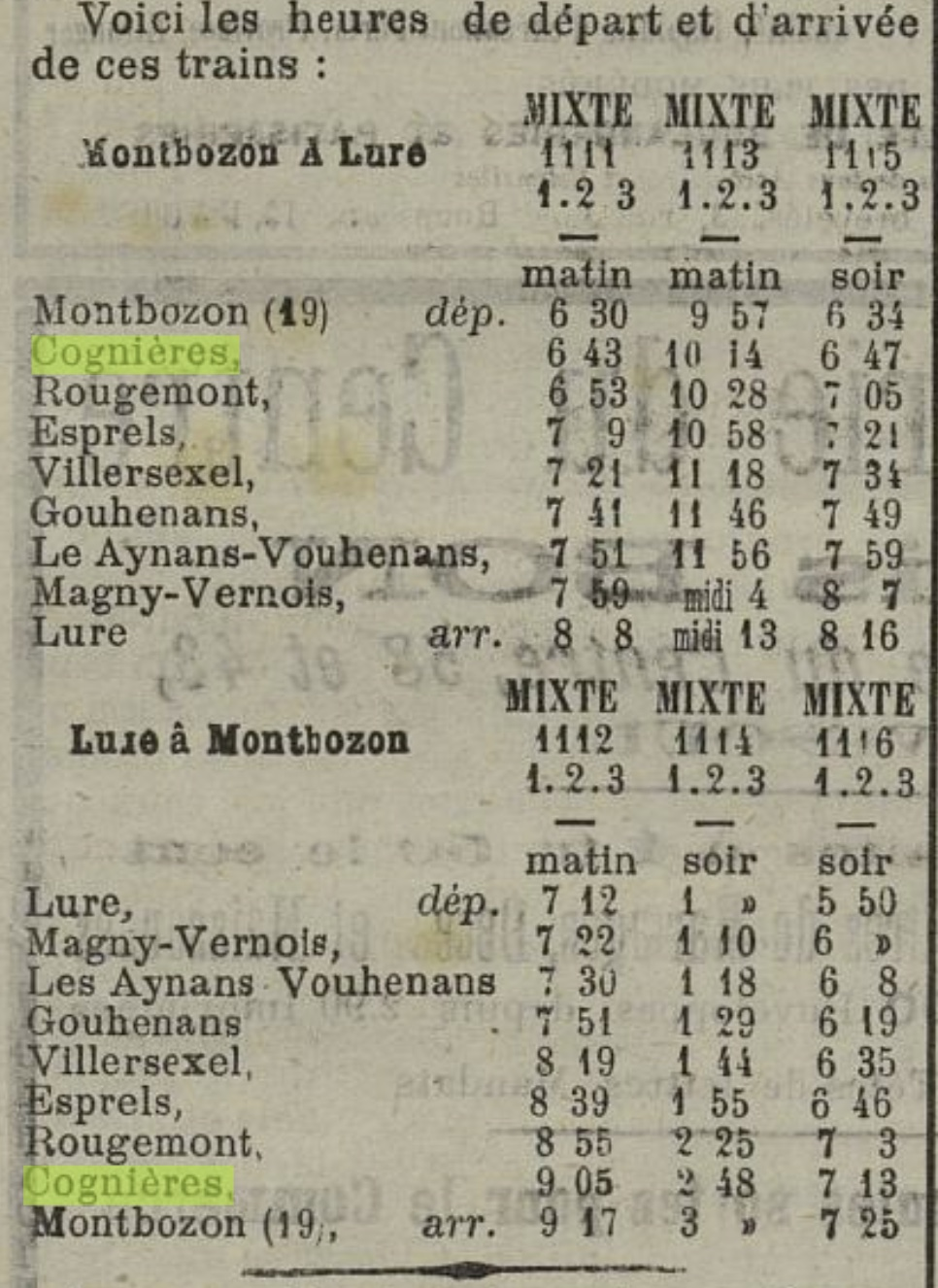
Train schedules

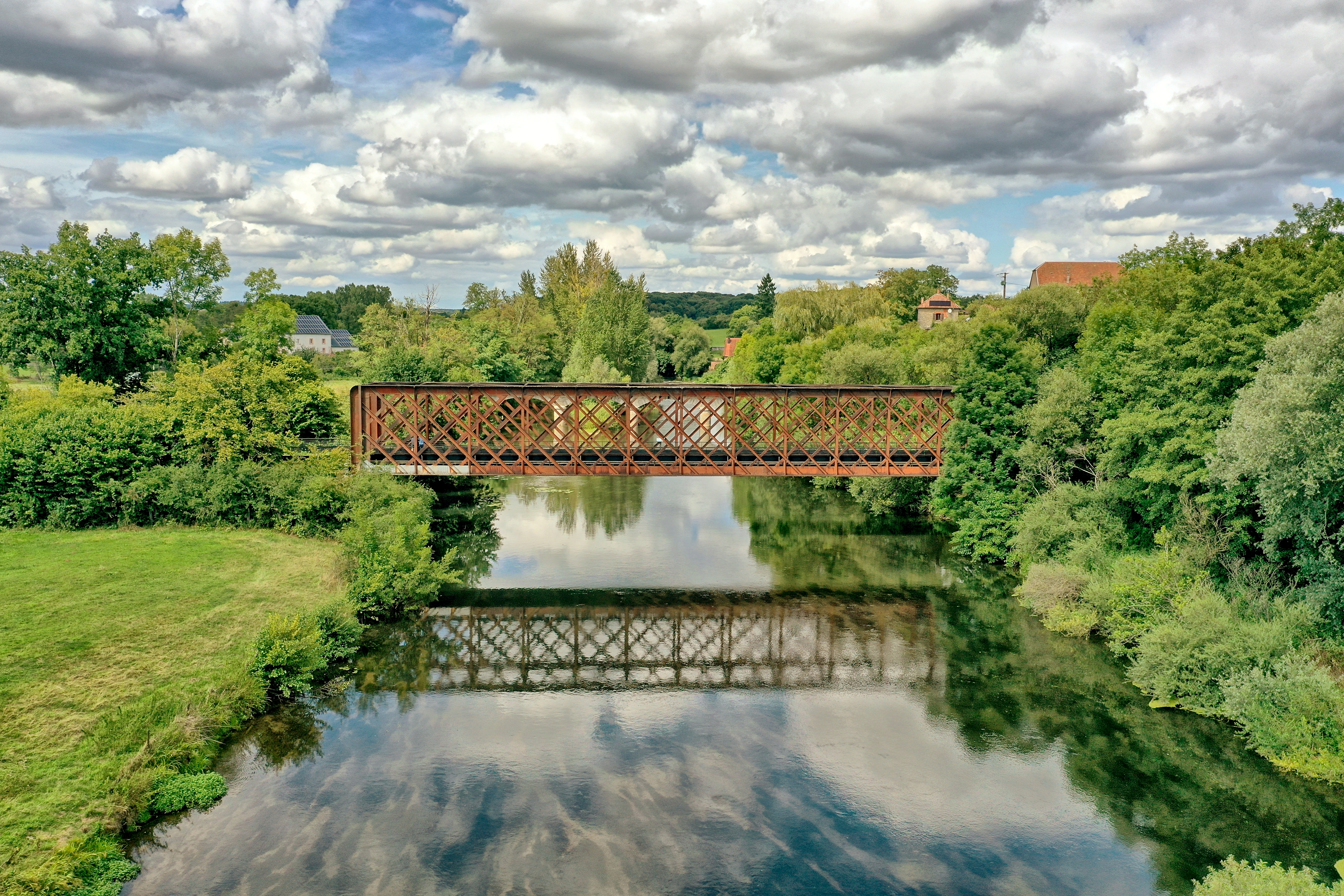
The bridge over the Ognon River in Montferney (municipality of Rougemont).

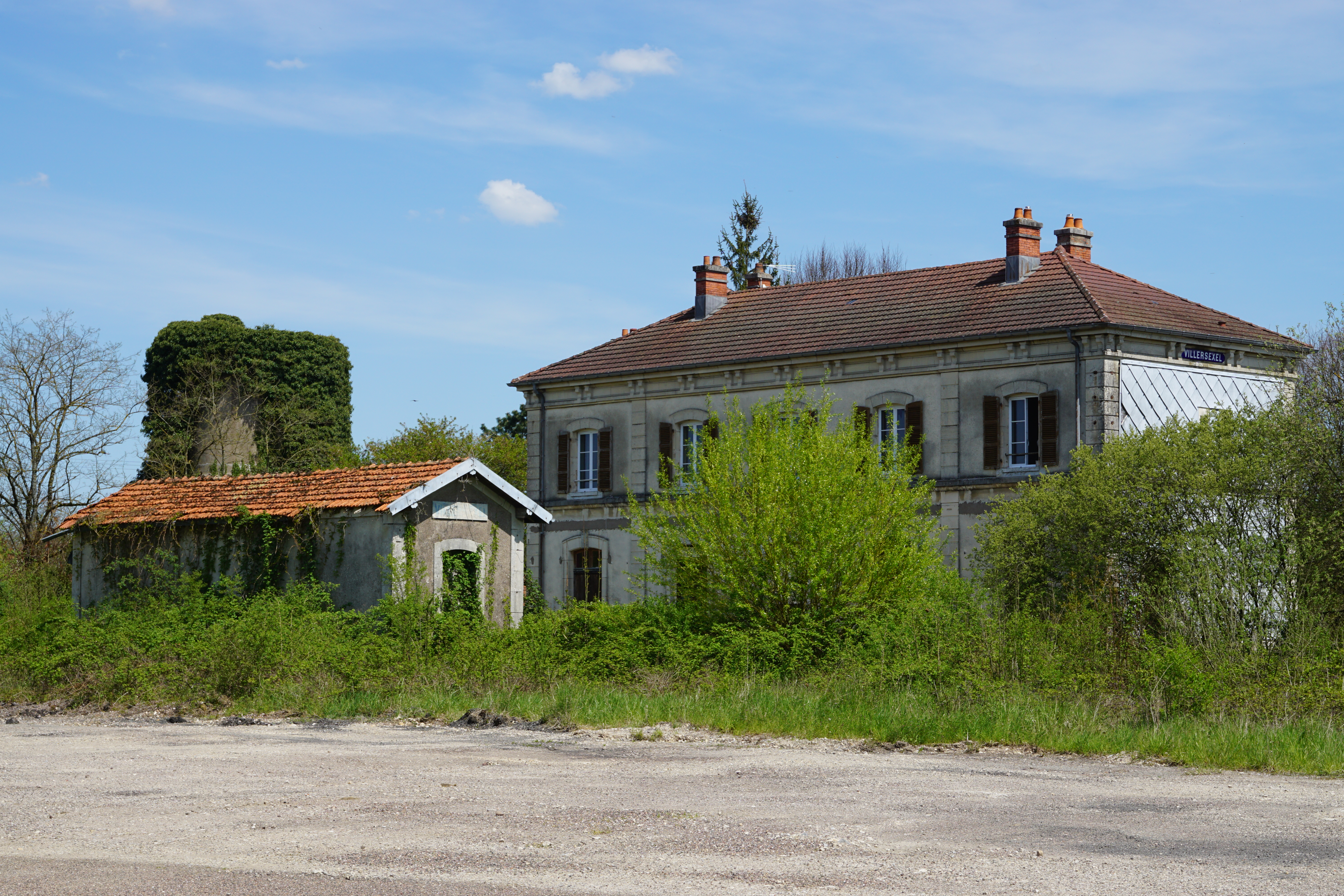
Villersexel station.

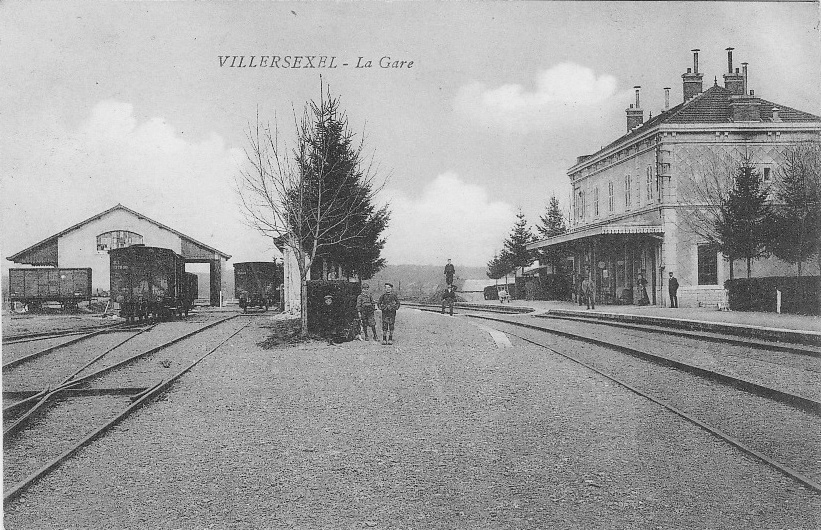
The same station in operation.

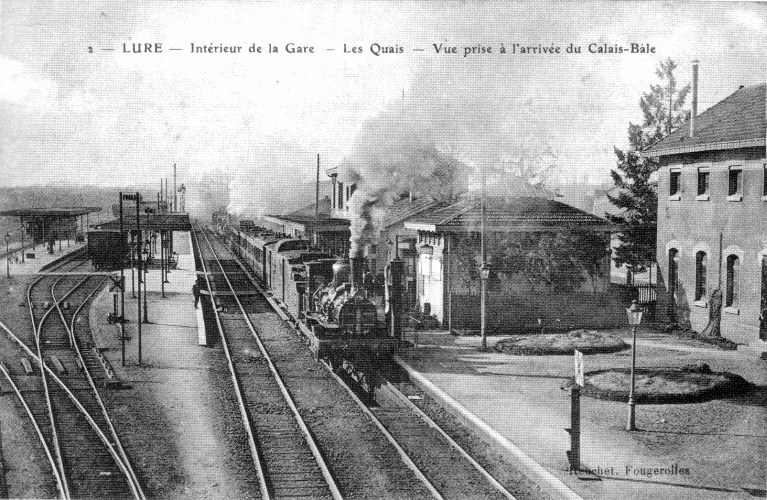
Lure station.

The section between Lure and Villersexel was reopened to freight traffic in February 2009 to supply materials for the construction of the Rhine–Rhône high-speed line. Rehabilitation work and the construction of an approximately 6 km connection to the high-speed line represented an investment of 10 million euros and were intended to reduce heavy road traffic by about 1,000 trucks per day.

The long-term preservation of part of the line was considered for the transit of Lorraine–Mediterranean high-speed trains, to link the Blainville–Damelevières–Lure line to the Rhine–Rhône high-speed line. This option was ultimately abandoned. The section developed between the original route and the high-speed line via the construction base was converted into a departmental road to bypass the town of Villersexel. Passenger transit between Lorraine and the Mediterranean regions was instead planned via the Belfort–Montbéliard high-speed station following the opening of the Belfort–Delle line to passenger traffic in 2016.

On 12 September 2012, the importance of the project was highlighted in a letter to the President of the Republic, signed by local elected officials from Thionville to Belfort and Haute-Saône.

The 8.7 km section between Villersexel and Bonnal was converted into a greenway in 2015 by the community of municipalities of the Pays de Villersexel. By May 2019, the extension of the greenway from Villersexel to Lure was nearly complete and was scheduled to be inaugurated in June 2019.

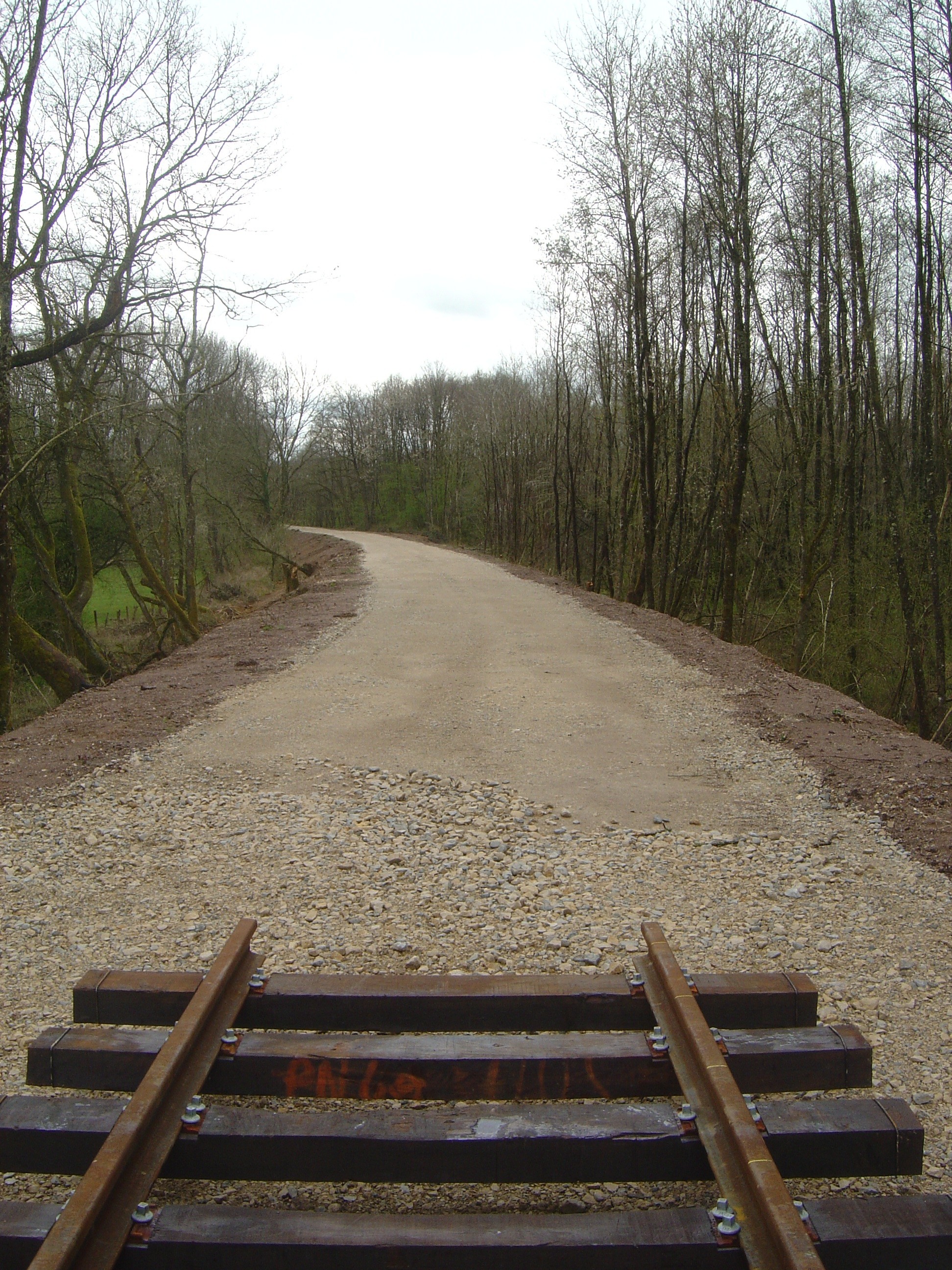
Work in April 2008.

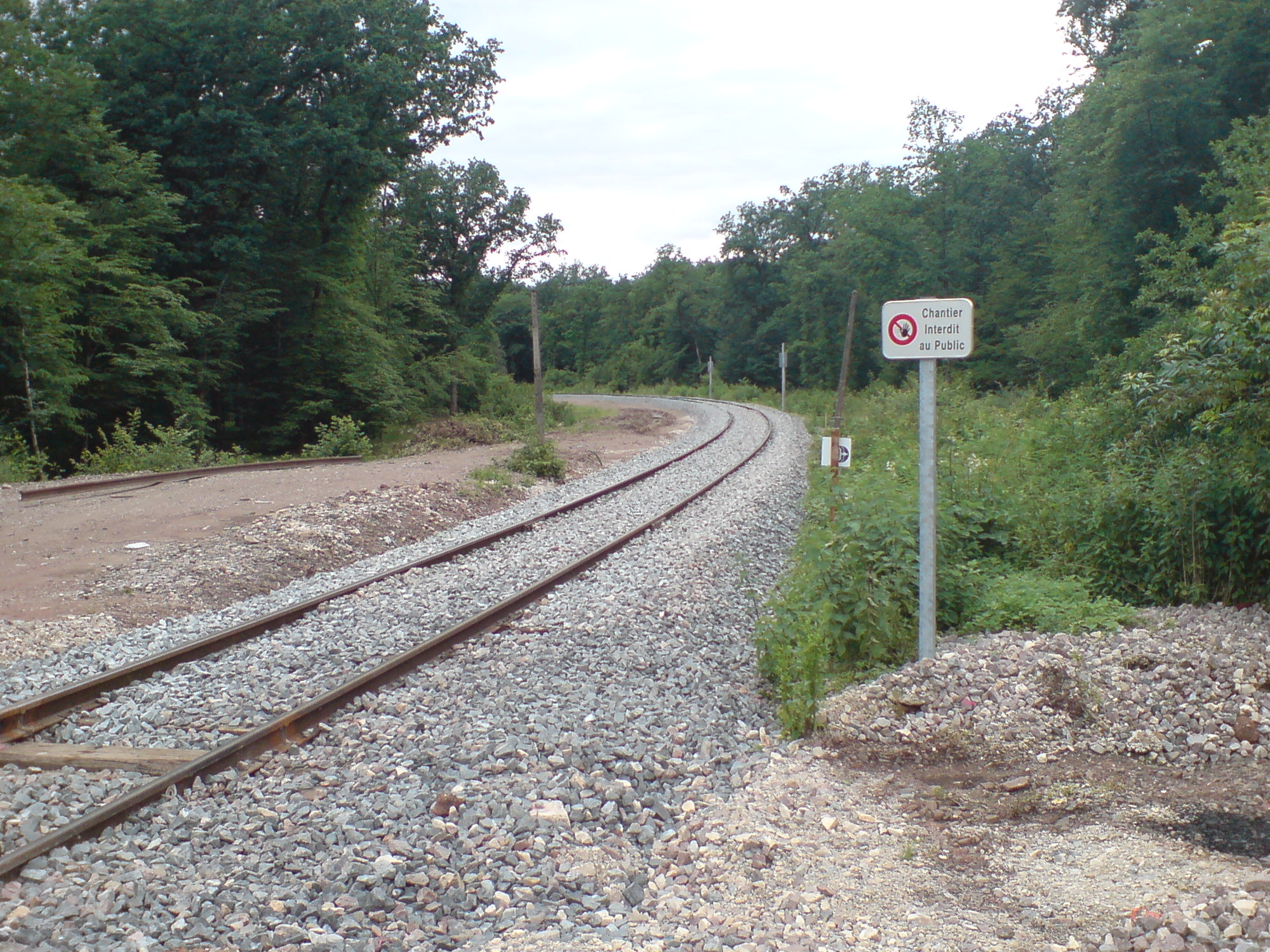
The start of the line from Lure station, renovated during the construction of the first phase of the eastern branch of the Rhine-Rhône high-speed rail line.

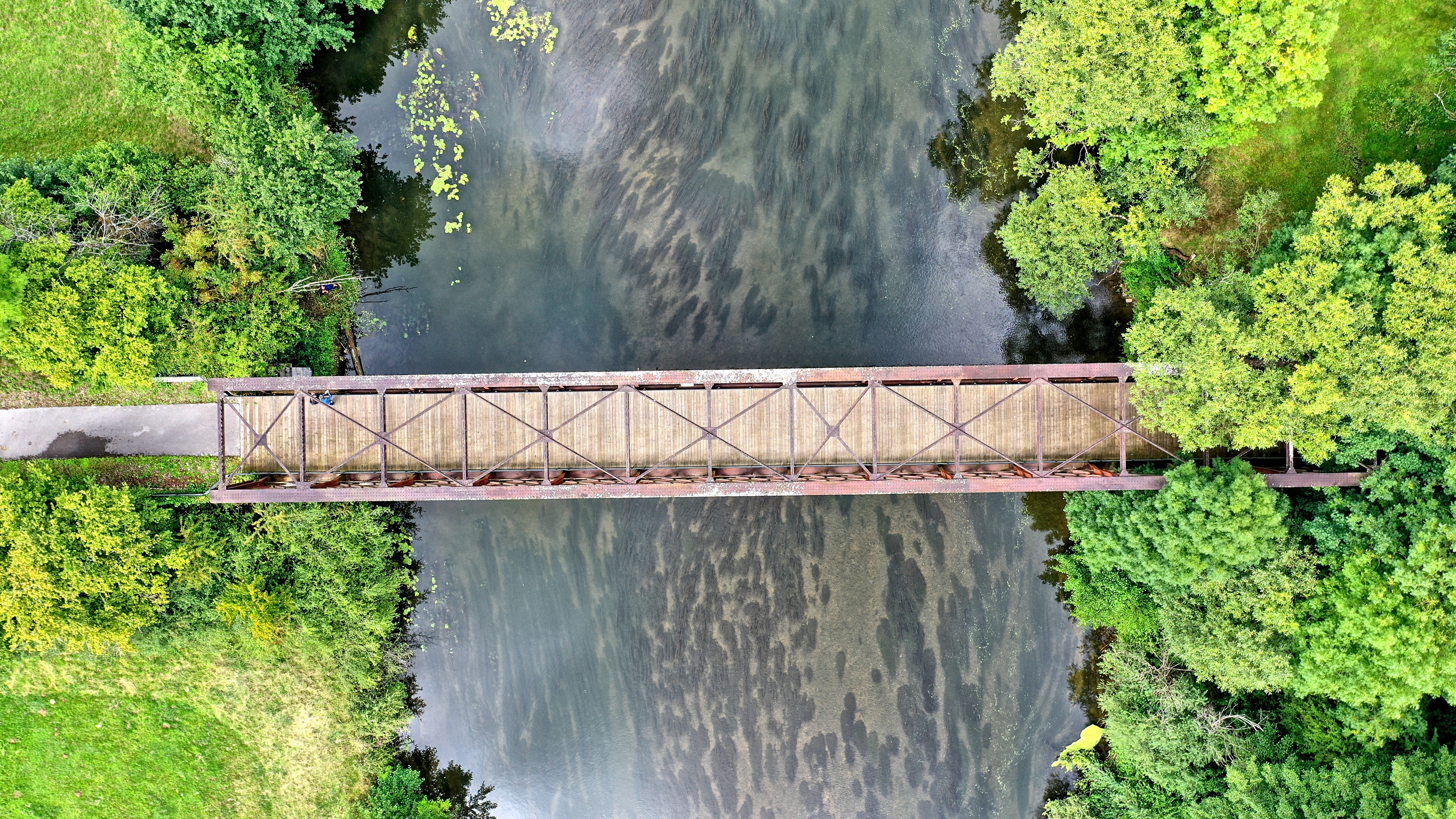
The bridge over the Ognon river converted into a greenway.

== See also ==
- List of railway lines in France
