= Flag of Franche-Comté =

French regional flag

The flag of Franche-Comté.

Version used by a separatist organization called Front Comtois. In addition to the traditional elements, it also contains a Cross of Burgundy.

The flag of Franche-Comté is a regional French flag inspired by the blazon of Franche-Comté. It depicts, on a field of azure semé with bars of gold (or) a crowned lion rampant, with tongue and claws gules. This blazon was created during the High Middle Ages by Otto IV, Count of Burgundy, as a replacement of the eagle which was formerly the heraldic representation of Burgundy, in order to indicate a closer relationship with the Kingdom of France. Like many other local symbols in France, it has several times come close to disappearing, either for lack of popular interest or when heraldry of this kind was abolished, notably after the French Revolution and, following the Second World War, in 1982. However, at the end of the 1980s, Edgar Faure, President of the council of the région of Franche-Comté, created the modern flag based on it. Although still rarely used, in the early 21st century it has gained in popularity. Le drapeau est donc décrit ainsi : sur champ d'azur semé de billettes d'or sans nombre, un lion d'or de Bourgogne rampant, armé et lampassé de gueules, brochant sur le tout.
