= Picolaton =

Mythological French bird

The picolaton (also known as the pique-au-mollet, quiperlibresson and cacalambri) is an imaginary bird present in the folklore of Franche-Comté.

It is best known as a threat towards lazy children, telling them the picolaton would nip their heels and buttocks if they did not hurry. It is thus akin to the bogeyman. Particularly irritating children are promised a visit to the incredible nest of the fabulous bird around April Fool's Day, provided they are very good and obedient. It supposedly nests in thorn bushes.

== See also ==
- Boogieman
