= Chemins de fer de Paris à Lyon et à la Méditerranée =

French railway company (1857–1937)

Coordinates: 48.875960°N 2.328807°E

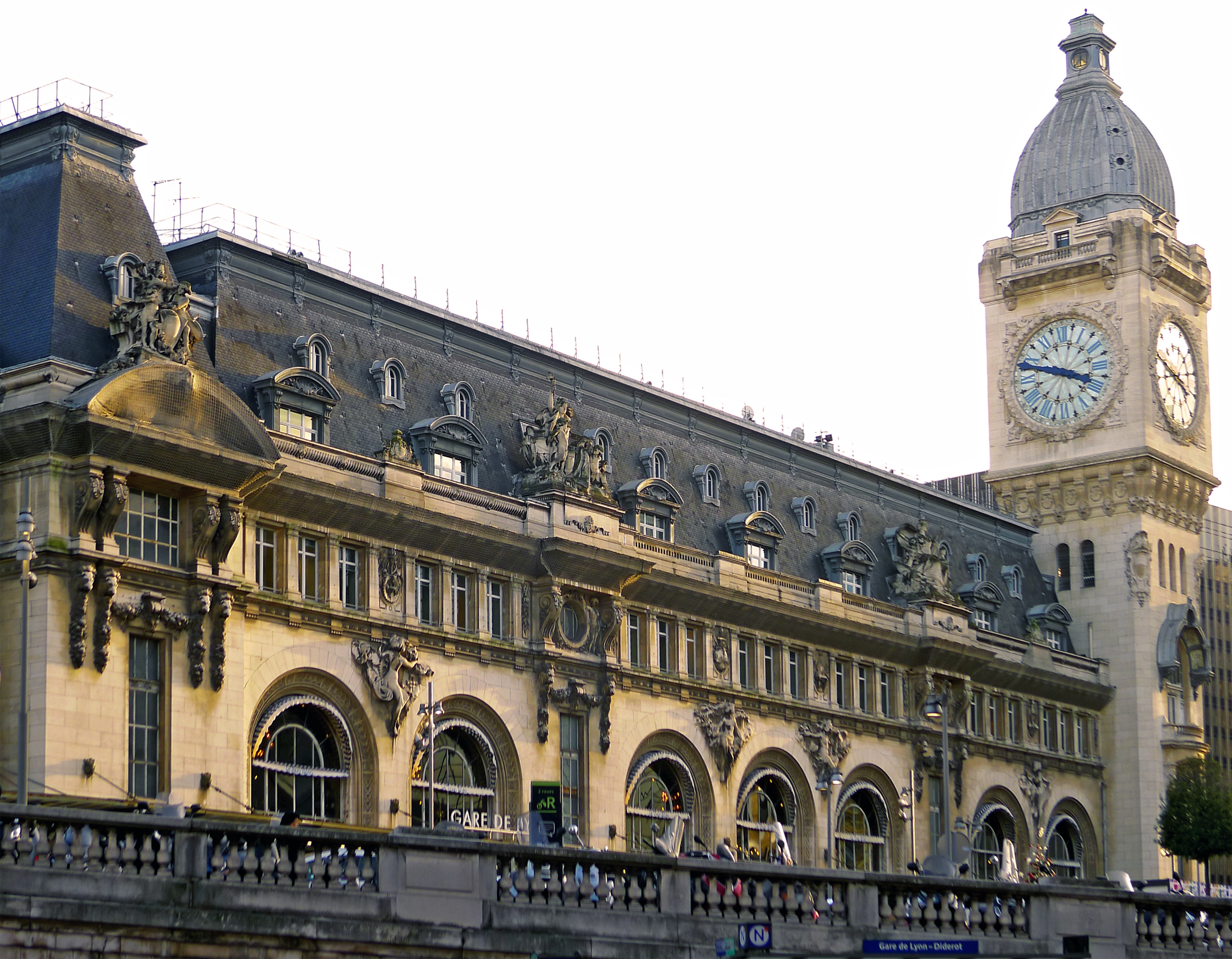
The Gare de Lyon in Paris was a major hub of the PLM

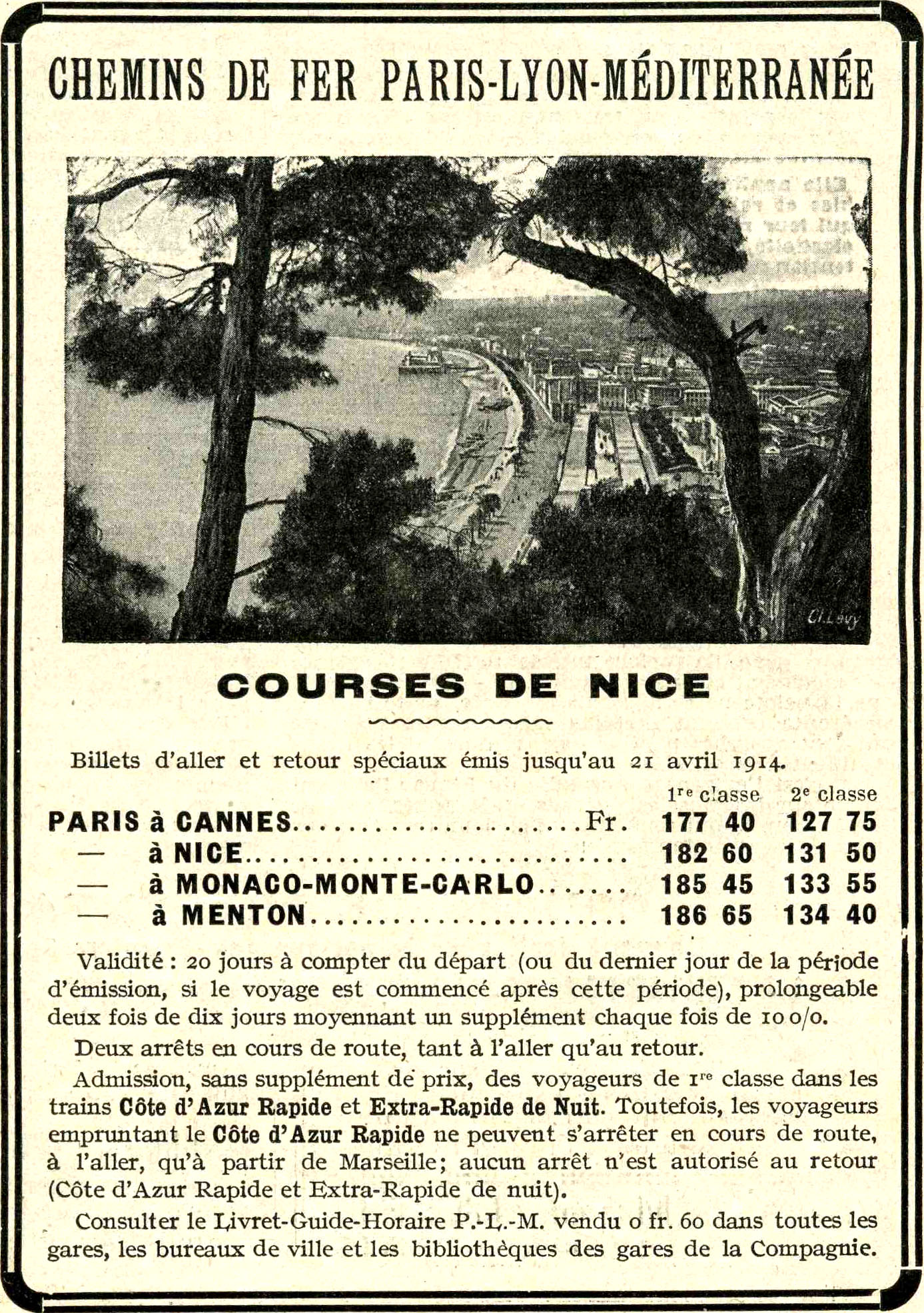
1914 advertisement in Le Miroir

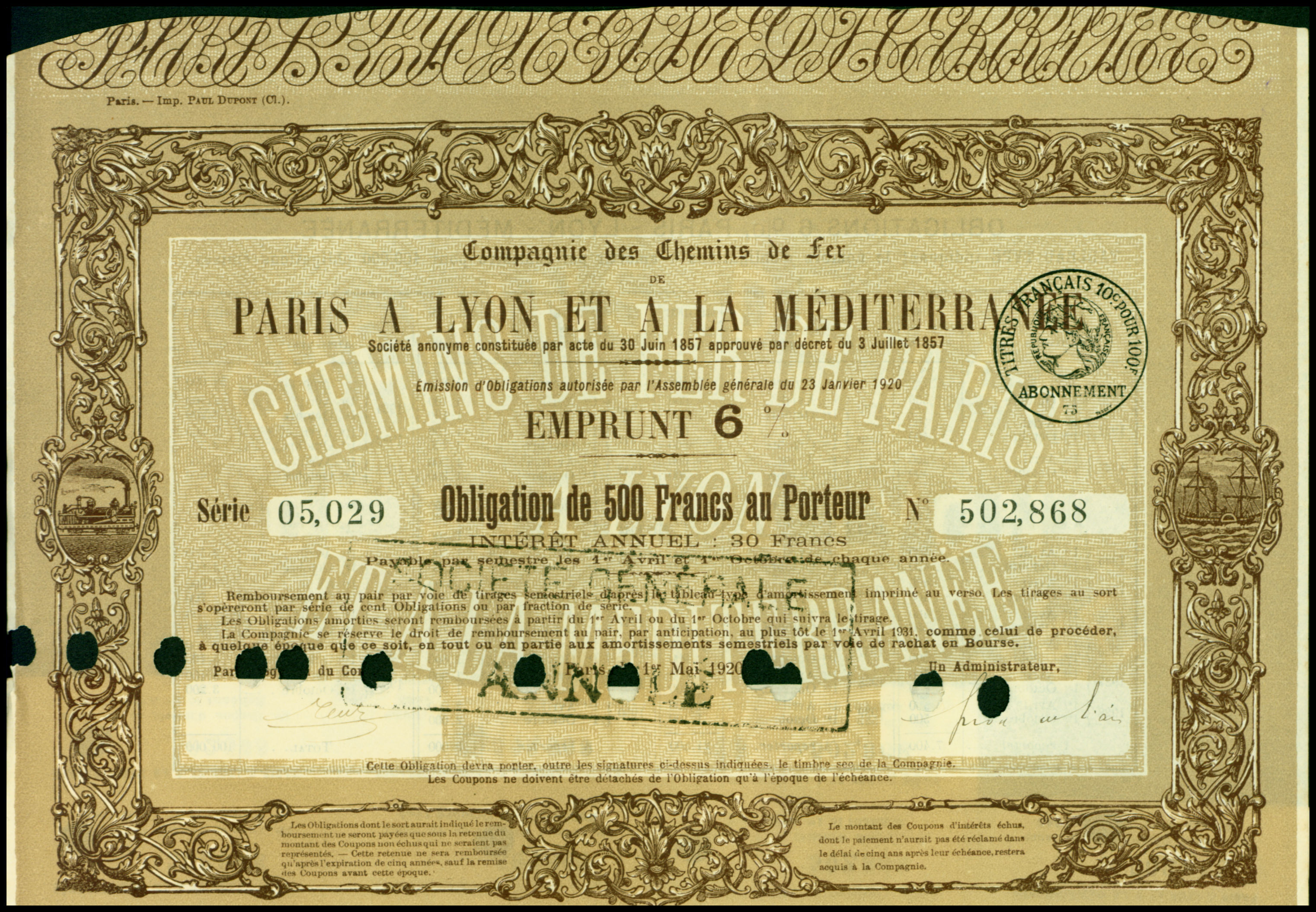
Bond of the Compagnie des Chemins de fer de Paris à Lyon et à la Méditerranée, issued 1 May 1920

The Compagnie des chemins de fer de Paris à Lyon et à la Méditerranée (French pronunciation: [kɔ̃paɲi de ʃəmɛ̃ də fɛʁ də paʁi a ljɔ̃ e a la meditɛʁane], lit. 'Railway Company of Paris to Lyon and the Mediterranean'), also known as the Chemins de fer Paris-Lyon-Méditerranée or simply PLM, established in 1857, was one of France’s main railway companies until the nationalization of all French railways and establishment of the Société nationale des chemins de fer français (SNCF) on 1 January 1938.

== History ==
Established on 3 July 1857, the PLM grew between 1858 and 1862 from the amalgamation of the earlier Paris–Lyon and Lyon–Méditerranée companies, as well as subsequently incorporating a number of smaller railways. The PLM operated chiefly in the Southeast of France, with a main line which connected Paris to the French Riviera by way of Dijon, Lyon and Marseille. The company was also the operator of railways in Algeria.

The PLM was absorbed in 1938 into the majority state-owned Société nationale des chemins de fer français, and its network became the southeastern region of the SNCF.

== Artworks ==
The PLM commissioned poster artist Roger Broders, sponsoring his travel to the French Riviera and the French Alps so he could visit the subjects of his work. Lithographs of travel posters Broders rendered for PLM are still available commercially. Several of their draughtsmen went on to notable careers, including Alfred Grévin and David Dellepiane.

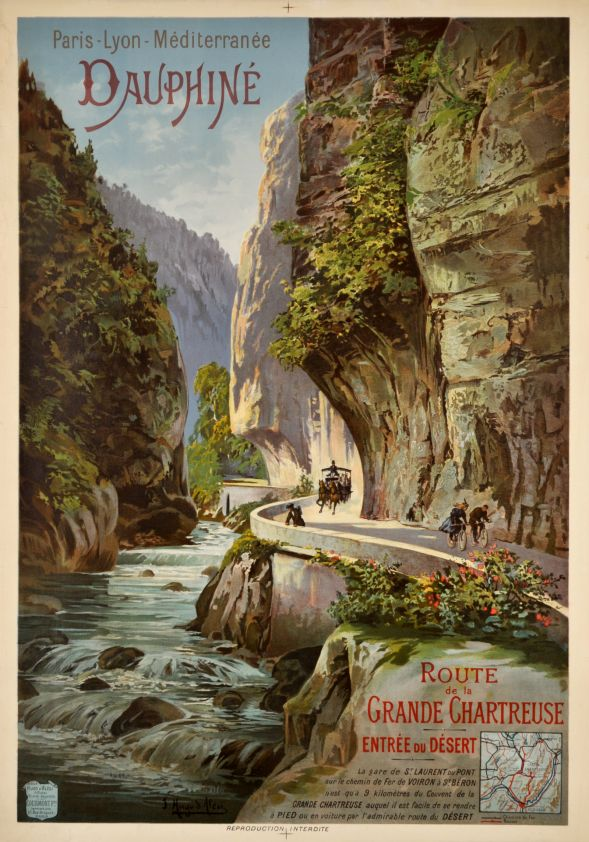
1895 PLM poster by Hugo d'Alesi for the promotion of the Dauphiné region

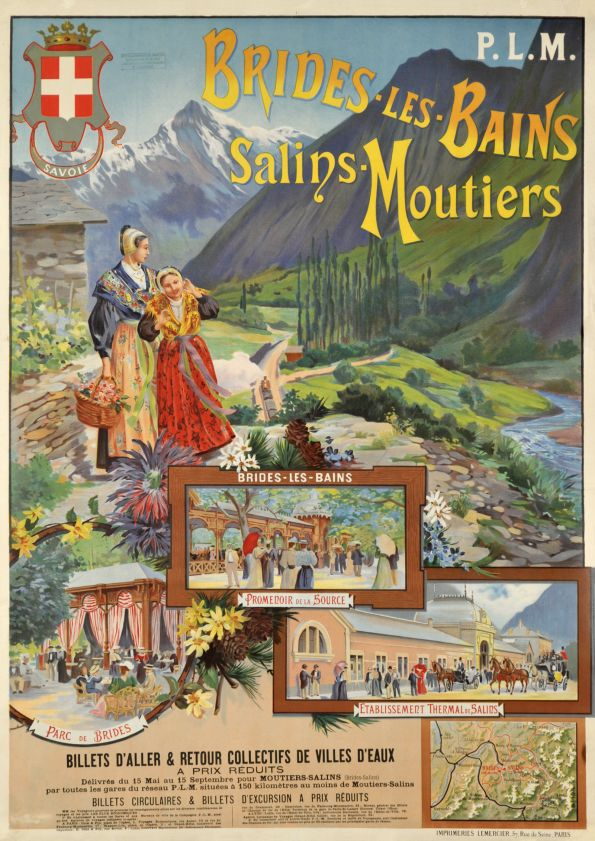
1895 PLM poster by Henry Ganier for the promotion of the Savoie region

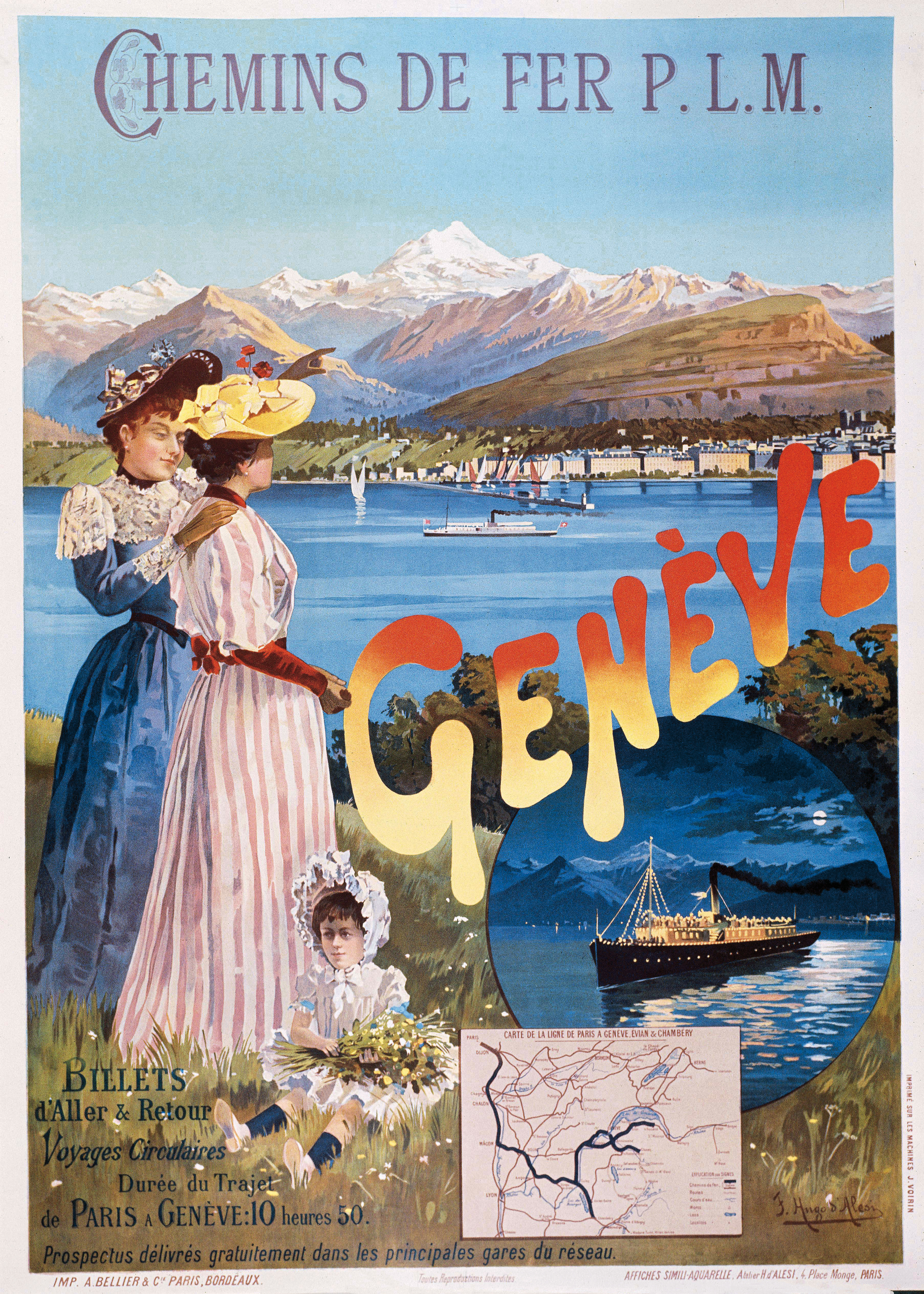
1895 PLM poster by Hugo d'Alesi for the promotion of the Geneva region

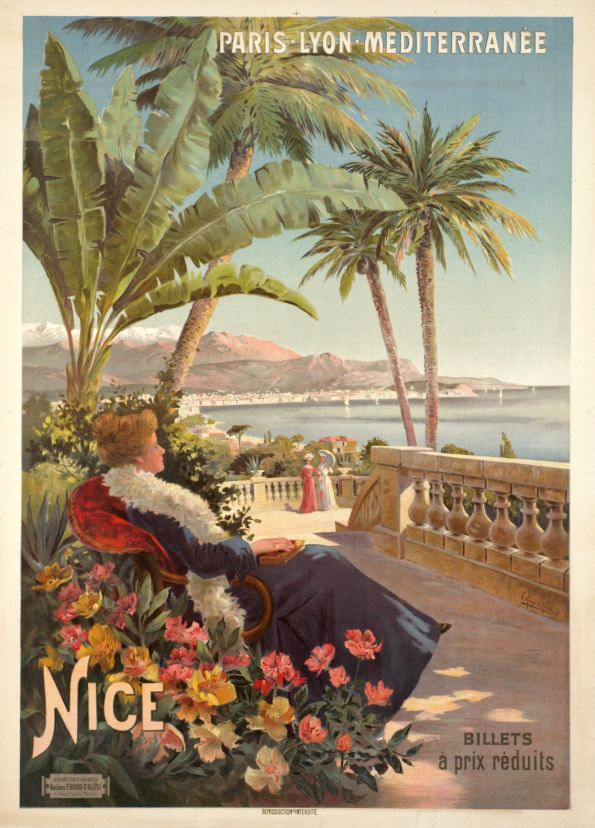
1900 PLM poster by Hugo d'Alesi for the promotion of the French Riviera region

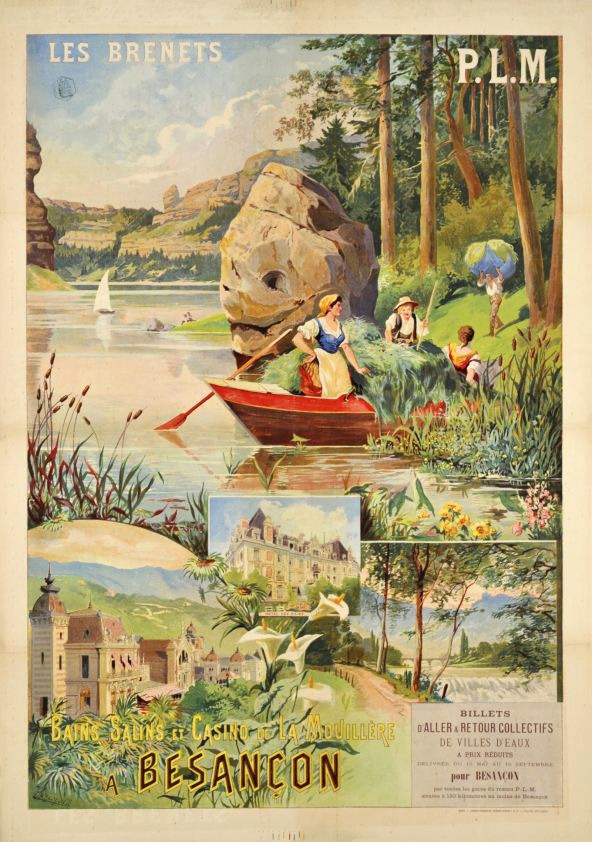
1905 PLM poster by Henry Ganier for the promotion of the Jura region

== Headquarters in Paris ==
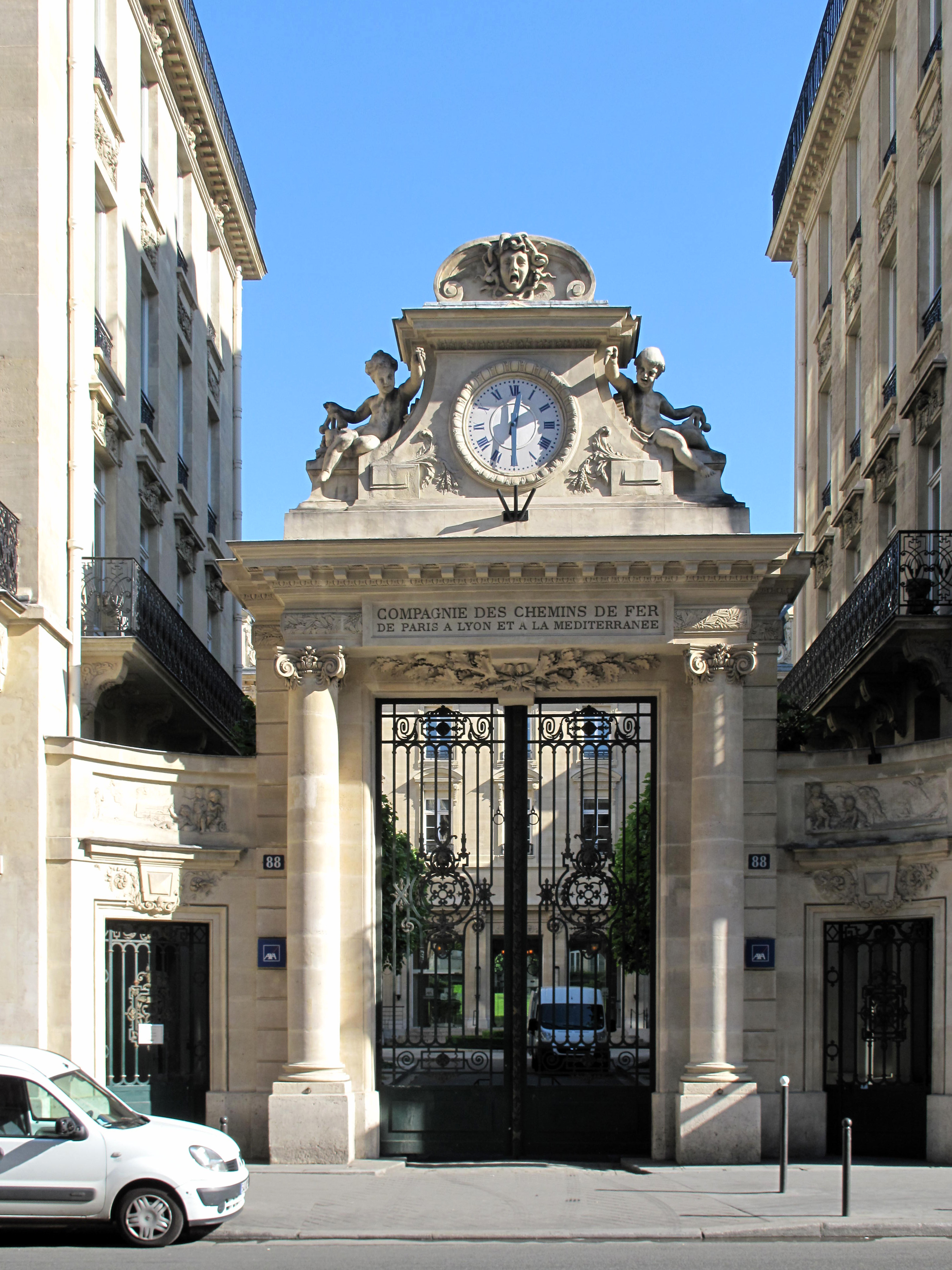
Entrance portal of the headquarters complex on 88, rue Saint-Lazare in Paris, photographed in 2009

The PLM head office was the most opulent headquarters building of any of the French railway companies. It was built in the late 1860s on the former grounds of the Tivoli Garden, with main entrance at 88, rue Saint-Lazare.

As soon as the SNCF was created on 1 January 1938, the former PLM's head office became the new state company's headquarters. The SNCF head office remained there until 1999 when it moved to a new building next to the Gare Montparnasse. The former PLM building was subsequently purchased by the insurance arm of Crédit Agricole, renovated under plans by architect Anthony Béchu, and branded Le Tivoli with reference to the site's pre-railway history. From 2003 it became an office of Axa then, from 2014, the head office of insurer Covéa.

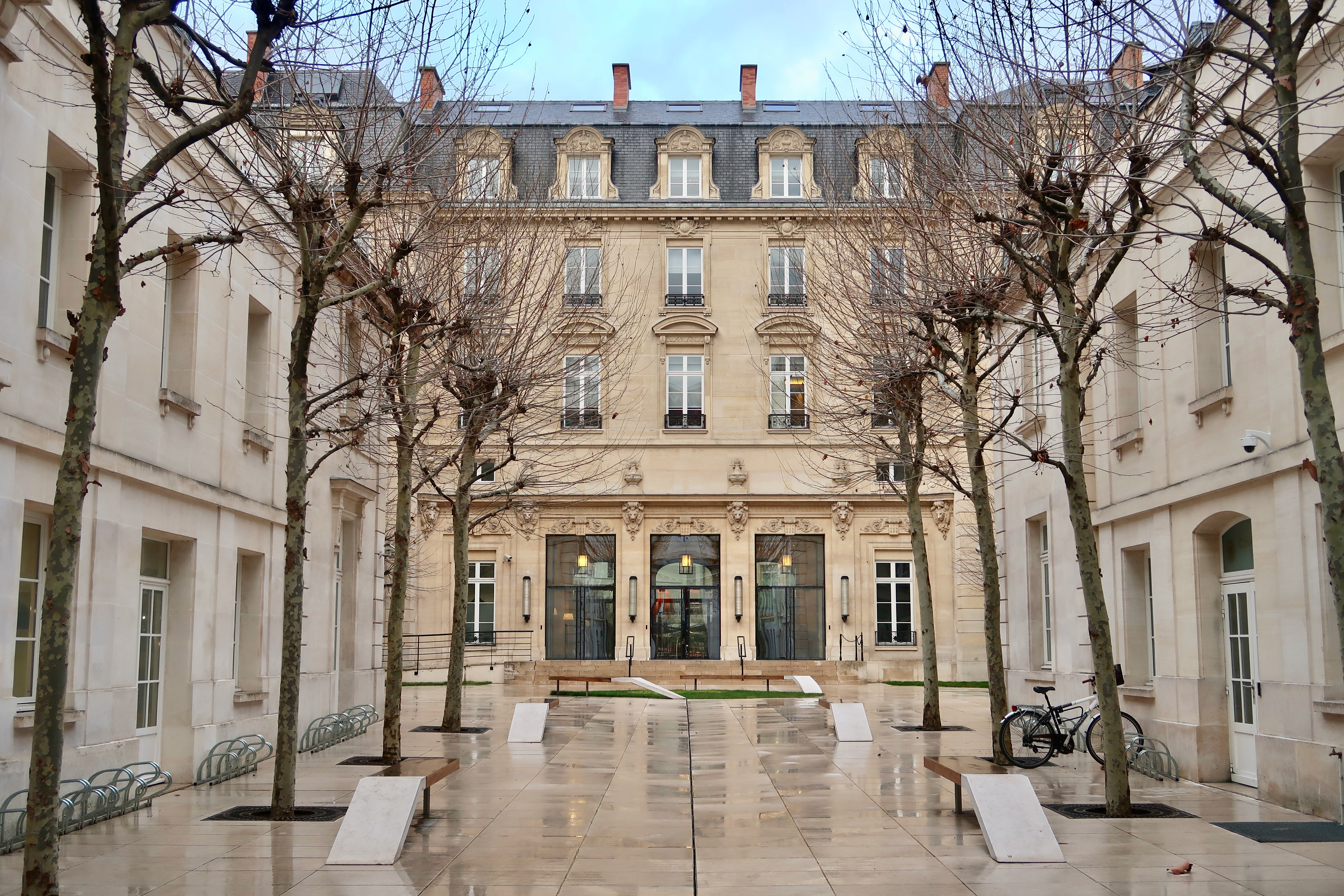
Courtyard of the renovated PLM headquarters

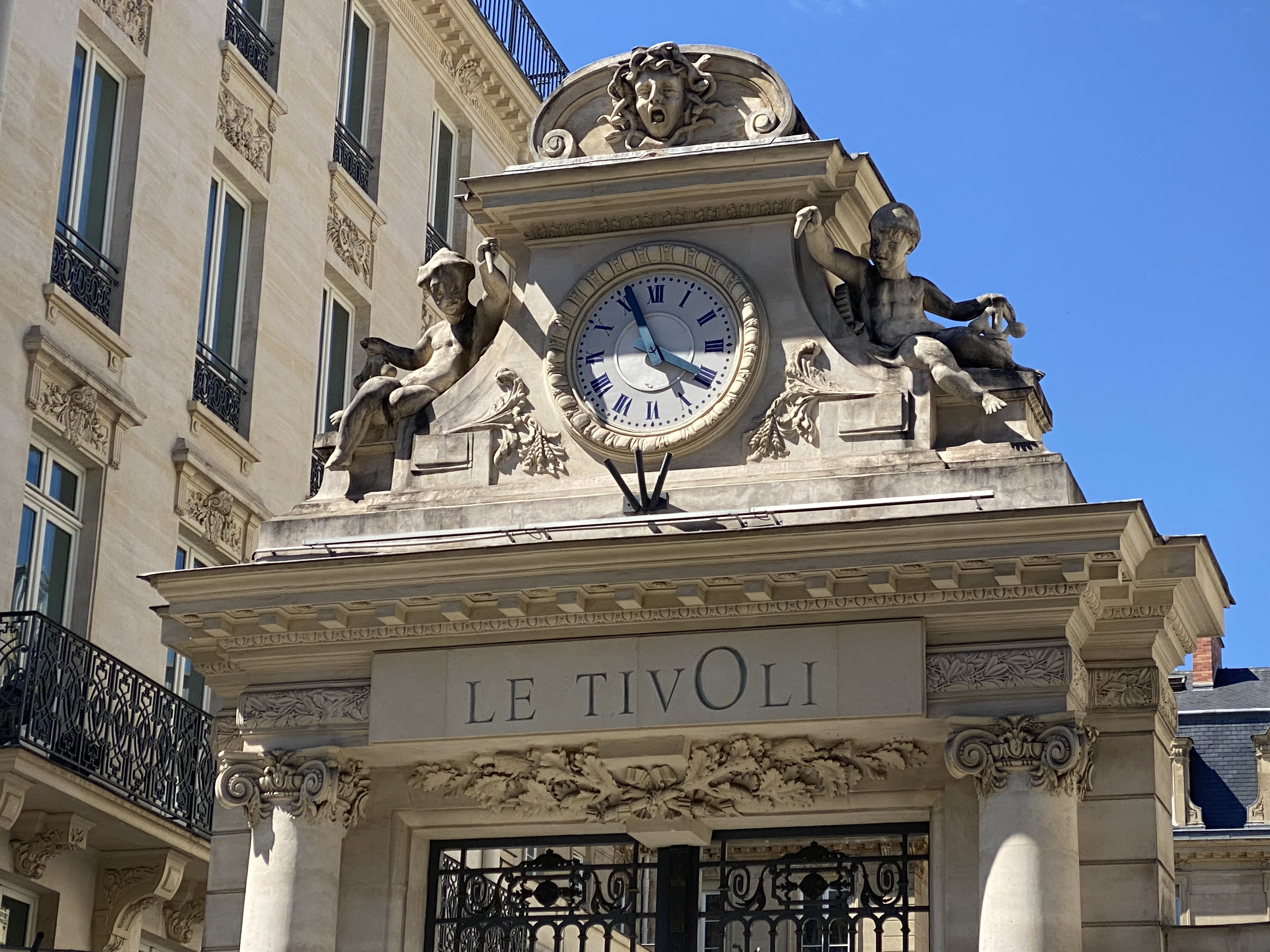
Detail of the entrance portal, after replacement of the PLM name by "Le Tivoli" in the 2010s

== See also ==
- Baron Barlatier de Mas
- Montbozon–Lure Line
