= Roger Broders =

French painter

Chamonix to Martigny via the gorges of Trient

Roger Broders (born Paris, France, 1883, died, Paris, 1953) was a French illustrator and artist. He was best known for his travel posters promoting tourism destinations in France, typically fashionable beaches of the Côte d'Azur and skiing resorts in the French Alps in the early 20th century.

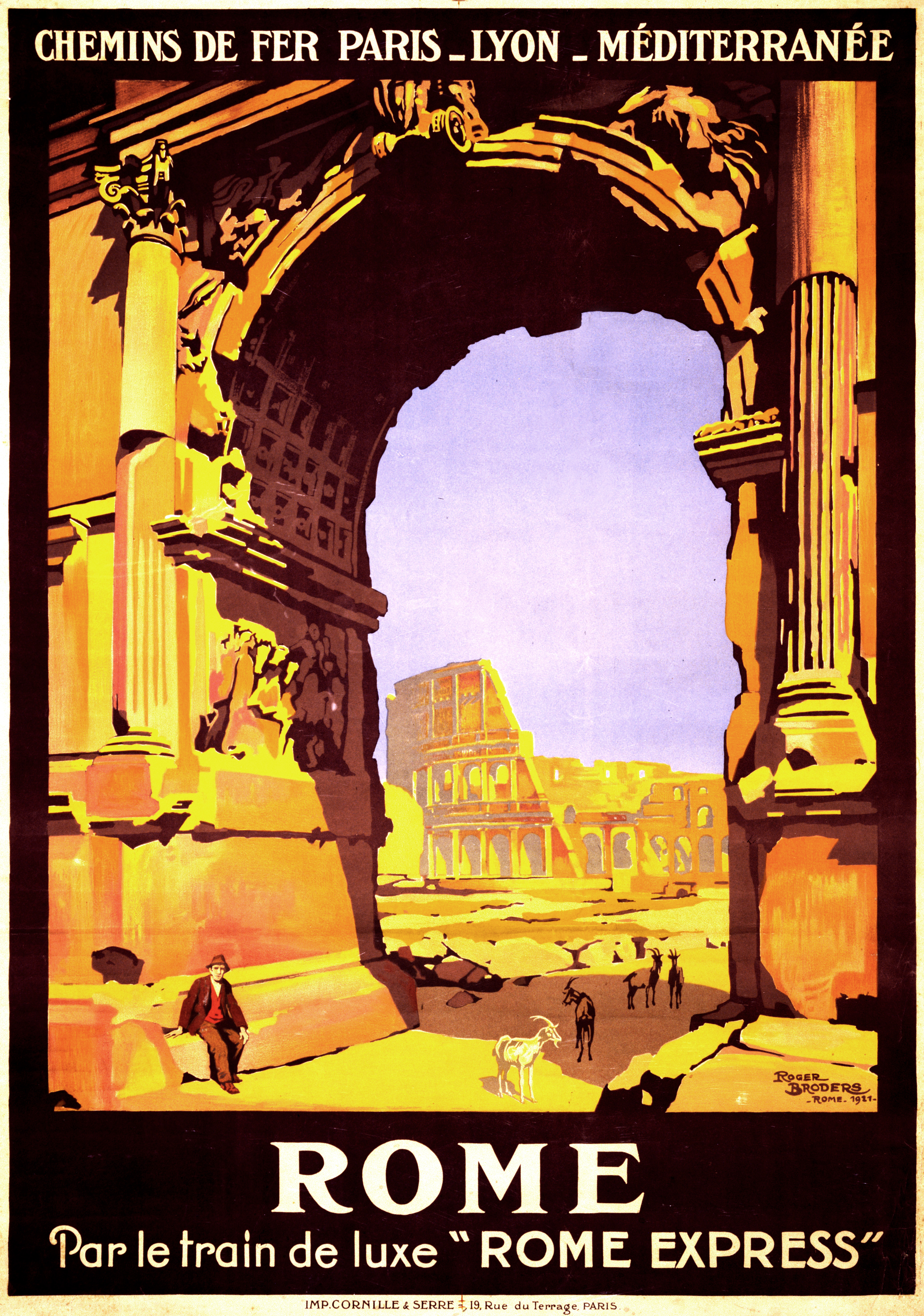
A 1921 poster highlighting the Colosseum of Rome

Broders' illustrations were distinctive for their simple lines and bold, flat areas of color, combined with noticeable graphical perspective showing the featured mountains and seascapes in the background. Broders' illustrations depicting people show active elongated figures wearing elegant, contemporary clothes. His posters were simply and boldly lettered identifying the destination, and were supplemented with a brief slogan.

The Paris Lyon Mediteranée Company (PLM), a railway, commissioned Broders' poster art, sponsoring his travel so he could visit the subjects of his work. From 1922 to 1932, Broders fully dedicated himself to poster art, though overall he produced fewer than 100 posters. Lithographs of Broders' travel posters are still available commercially. See for instance Christie's London Ski Sale on 21 January 2010. Others are shown in the book about Railway Posters, published in Munich in 2011 and listed below.

During the 1940s he illustrated four of the works of the German author Karl May which were published by Éditions Mame at Tours in France in French language.

== Literature ==
- Thierry Favre: Eisenbahnplakate - Railway Posters. Hirmer, München 2011, ISBN 978-3-7774-3771-2.
- Roger Broders: Travel Posters. Weill, Alain; Perry, Israel, New York 2002, ISBN 0-9712059-3-0.
