= Montbozon =

- Commune
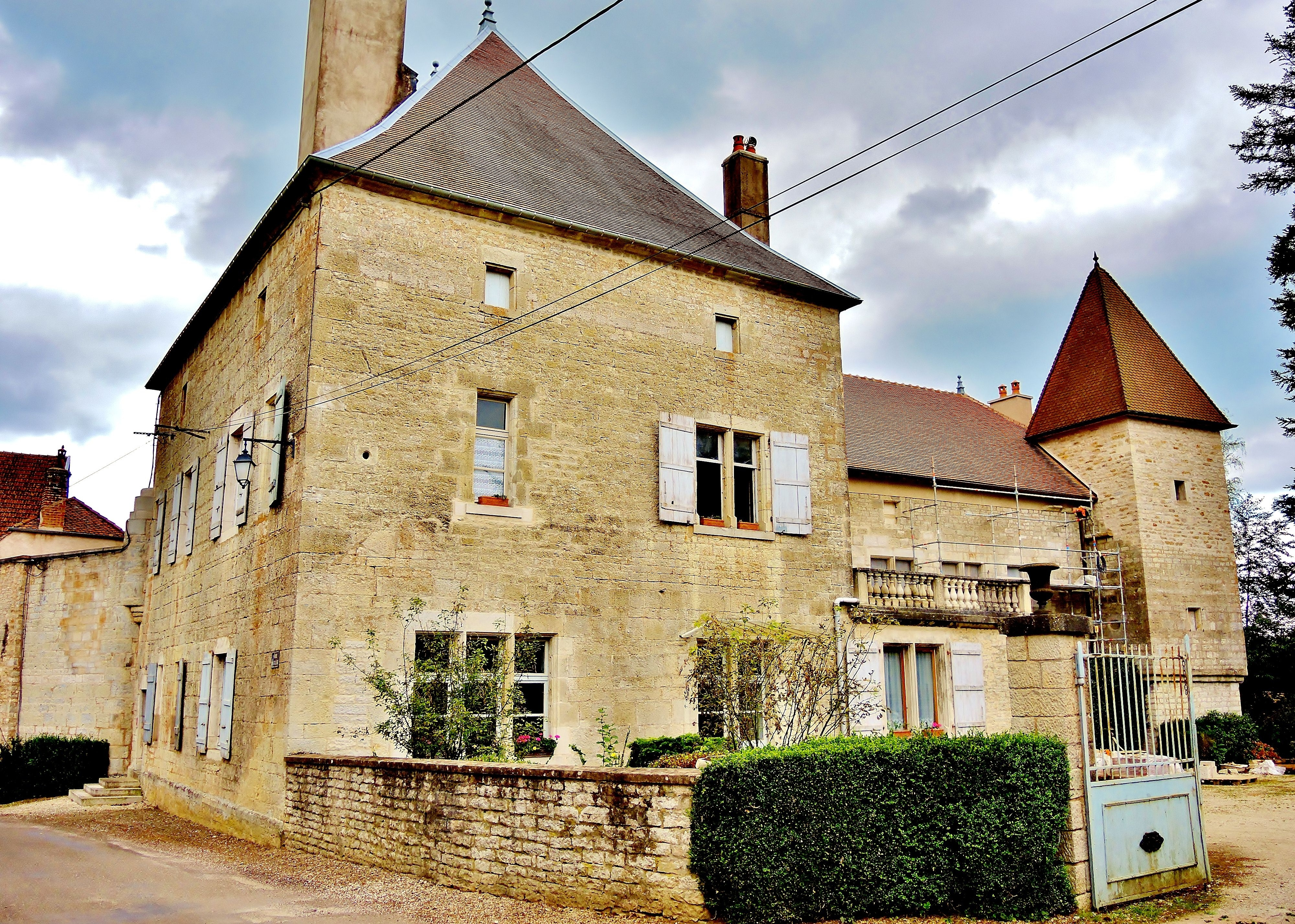
- Bouday House in Montbozon

- Coat of arms
- Location of Montbozon
- Location within France Location within Bourgogne-Franche-Comté
- Coordinates: 47°28′01″N 6°15′34″E
- Country: France
- Region: Bourgogne-Franche-Comté
- Department: Haute-Saône
- Arrondissement: Vesoul
- Canton: Rioz

Government
  - Mayor (2020–2026): Jean-Yves Gamet
- Area^{1}: 8.63 km^{2} (3.33 sq mi)
- Highest elevation: 319 m (1,047 ft)
- Lowest elevation: 237 m (778 ft)
- Population (2023): 553
  - Density: 64.1/km^{2} (166/sq mi)
- Time zone: UTC+01:00 (CET)
  - Summer (DST): UTC+02:00 (CEST)
- INSEE/Postal code: 70357 /70230
- ^{1} French Land Register data, which excludes lakes, ponds, glaciers > 1 km^{2} (0.386 sq mi or 247 acres) and river estuaries.

Montbozon (French pronunciation: [mɔ̃bozɔ̃]) is a commune in the Haute-Saône department in the region of Bourgogne-Franche-Comté in eastern France.

== See also ==
- Communes of the Haute-Saône department
