= Front Comtois =

Political party

- Founded: 2008
- Ideology: Neo-Nazism; Neo-Fascism; Regionalism; Racism; Xenophobia; Anti-Semitism; Islamophobia; Homophobia

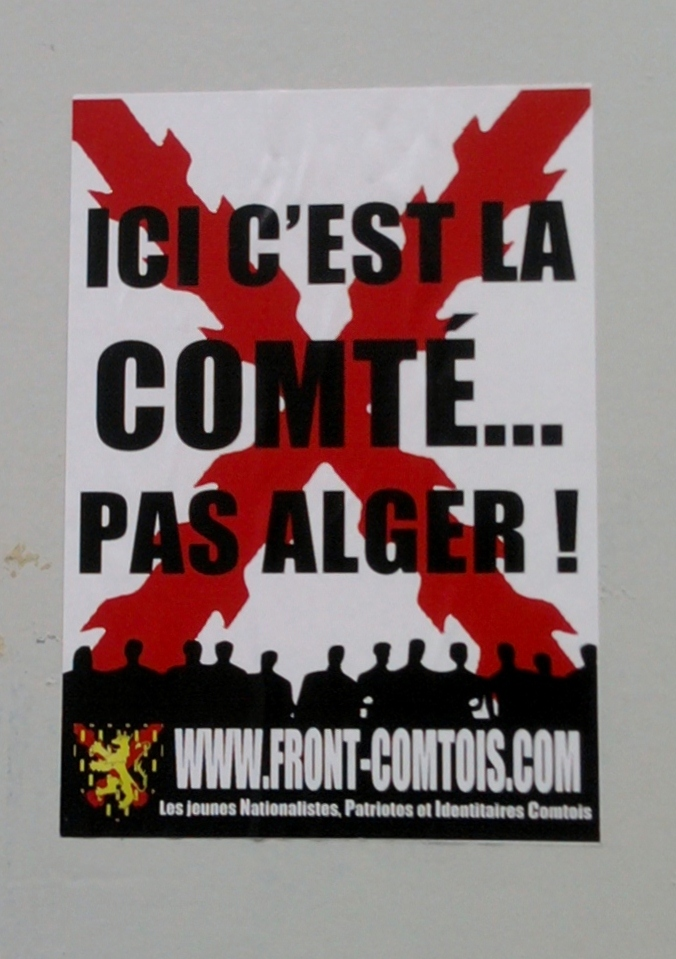
Placard of Front Comtois: "Ici c'est la Comté, pas Alger" ("Here it's the Comty, not Alger").

The Front Comtois is a French small political group, located in France, in the region Franche-Comté. Its ideologies include racism, islamophobia, antisemitism, historical revisionism, homophobia, opposition to the legalization of abortion and neo-nazism. It was created in 2008. Members degraded a mosque with blood and a pig's head and racist inscriptions. Now Front Comtois has between 30 and 100 members, and often demonstrate in Montbéliard, Belfort and Besançon and many other small cities. The organisation was condemned and fined in 2011 for incitement to racial and religious hatred, at 6400 euros of penalty.
