= Franche-Comté =

Franche-Comté Fraintche-Comtè (Frainc-Comtou) Franche-Comtât (Arpitan)
- Region of France
- Flag Coat of arms
- Motto(s): Comtois, rends-toi ! Nenni, ma foi ! Comtois, surrender! No indeed!
- Coordinates: 47°00′N 6°00′E
- Country: France
- Dissolved: 1 January 2016
- Prefecture: Besançon
- Departments: 4: Doubs (25); Jura (39); Haute-Saône (70); Territoire de Belfort (90)

Area
  - Total: 16,202 km^{2} (6,256 sq mi)

Population (1 January 2021)
  - Total: 1,179,601
  - Density: 72.806/km^{2} (188.57/sq mi)
- Demonym: Comtois

GDP
  - Total: €37.752 billion (2024)
  - Per capita: €32,129 (2024)
- Time zone: UTC+1 (CET)
  - Summer (DST): UTC+2 (CEST)
- ISO 3166 code: FR-I
- NUTS Region: FRC2
- Website: www.franche-comte.fr (Redirects to www.bourgognefranchecomte.fr)

Franche-Comté (UK: /ˌfrɒ̃ʃ kɒ̃ˈteɪ/, US: /- koʊnˈ-/; French: [fʁɑ̃ʃ kɔ̃te]) is a cultural and historical region of northeastern France. It is composed of the modern departments of Doubs, Jura, Haute-Saône and the Territoire de Belfort. In 2021, its population was 1,179,601.

From 1956 to 2015, the Franche-Comté was a French administrative region. Since 1 January 2016, it has been part of the new region Bourgogne-Franche-Comté.

The region is named after the Franche Comté de Bourgogne (Free County of Burgundy), definitively separated from the region of Burgundy proper in the fifteenth century. In 2016, these two-halves of the historic Kingdom of Burgundy were reunited, as the region of Bourgogne-Franche-Comté. It is also the 6th biggest region in France. The name "Franche-Comté" is feminine because the word "comté" in the past was generally feminine, although today it is masculine.

The principal cities are the capital Besançon, Belfort and Montbéliard. Other important cities are Dole (the capital before the region was conquered by Louis XIV in the late seventeenth century), Vesoul (capital of Haute-Saône), Arbois (the "wine capital" of the Jura), and Lons-le-Saunier (the capital of Jura).

== History ==
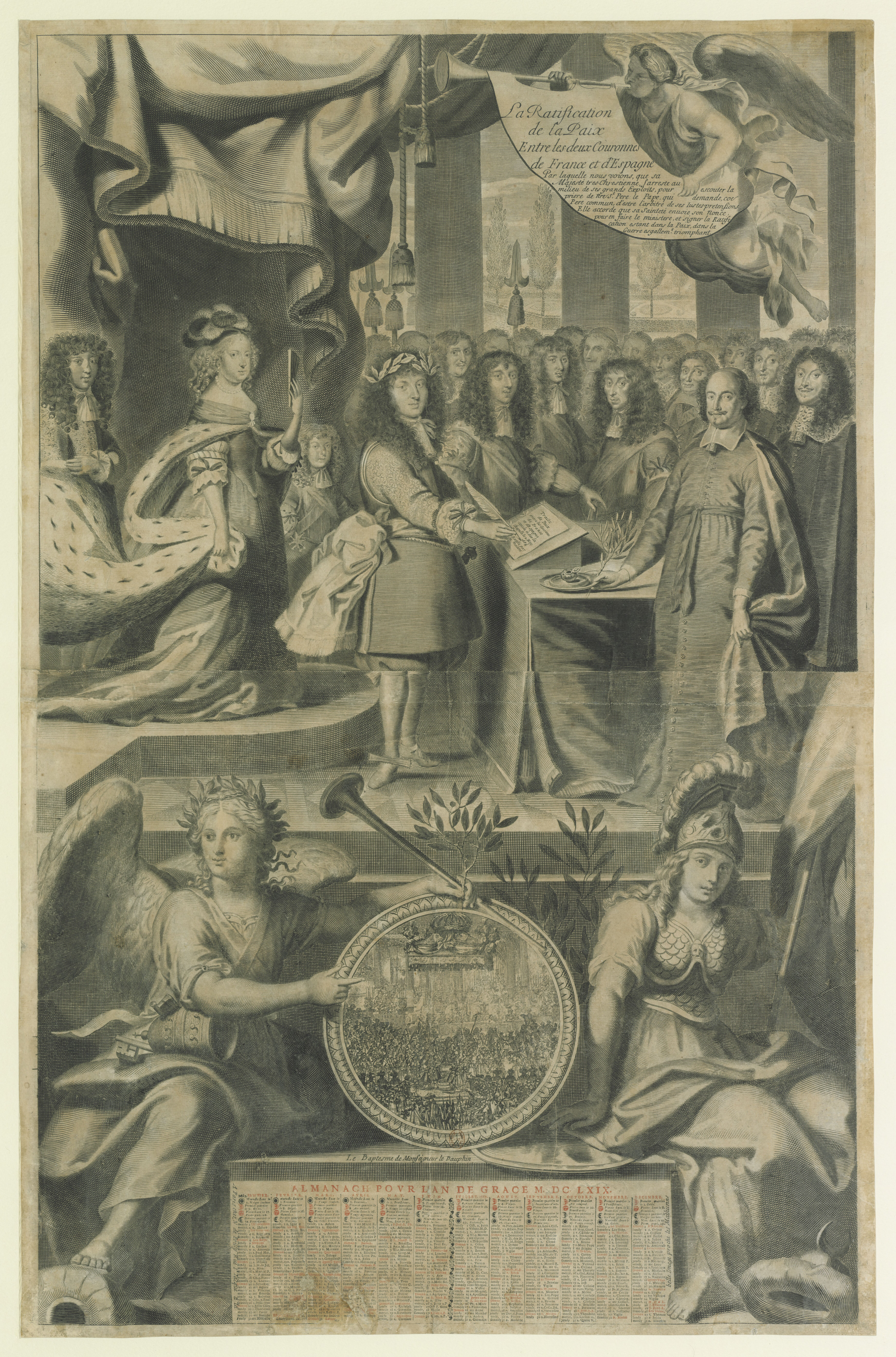
Ratification of the Treaty of Aix-la-Chapelle (1668)

The region has been inhabited since the Paleolithic age and was occupied by the Gauls. It was then heavily settled by Germanic peoples during the Germanic migrations, most notably the Burgundians, who settled in the region after the Gauls had vacated the area. Later, it was part of the territory of the Alemanni in the fifth century, then the Kingdom of Burgundy from 457 to 534. The Burgundians adopted Chalcedonian Christianity, Christianizing the region. In 534, it became part of the Frankish kingdom. In 561 it was included in the Merovingian Kingdom of Burgundy under Guntram, the third son of Clotaire I. In 613, Clotaire II reunited the Frankish Kingdom under his rule, and the region remained a part of the Kingdom of Burgundy under the later Merovingians and Carolingians.

=== Free County of Burgundy ===
Under the Treaty of Verdun (843), all north-western regions of Carolingian Burgundy were designated to West Francia, while the rest of Burgundy went to Middle Francia. By the end of the 9th century, the West-Frankish part was organized as the Duchy of Burgundy, while eastern regions belonged to the Kingdom of Burgundy, that was gradually divided into several feudal polities. One of them, encompassing much of the Upper Burgundy, became known as the County of Burgundy, and since 1032 it belonged to the Holy Roman Empire. The name "Free County of Burgundy" (Franche Comté de Bourgogne; Freigrafschaft Burgund) did not appear officially until 1366.

The Free County (Franche Comté) was acquired by John the Fearless, Duke of Burgundy, thus placing the Free County under the same feudal lord as the Duchy. They were separated again by the end of the 15th century, since duke and count Charles the Bold died in 1477 without sons, and his cousin King Louis XI consequently failed to secure all of Burgundy, ceding the Free County to Philip of Austria by the Treaty of Senlis in 1493. In 1506, Philip was succeeded by his son Charles, the future king of Spain (1516) and the Holy Roman Emperor (1519). All of his Burgundian domains, including the Free County were later passed to his son Philip II of Spain, thus solidifying the political ties between Habsburg domains in Burgundy and the Habsburg Spain. Although ruled by Spanish Habsburgs, the Free County was never annexed into the Kingdom of Spain, and thus remained a domain within the Holy Roman Empire.

In 1598, king Philip II of Spain ceded the Free County of Burgundy, together with the Spanish Netherlands, to his daughter Isabella Clara Eugenia, who ruled those lands as a sovereign monarch, jointly with her husband Archduke Albert VII of Austria. After Albert's death in 1621, all of those regions, including the Free County of Burgundy, were returned to the Spanish Habsburgs, but highly respected princess Isabella was left to rule as governess until her death in 1633, under the sovereignty of her cousin, king Philip IV of Spain.

During the War of Devolution (1667–1668), the region of Franche-Comté was occupied by the French Royal Army, but it was soon returned to Spanish Habsburgs under the Treaty of Aix-la-Chapelle, that was signed on 2 May 1668.

During the War of the Quadruple Alliance (1673–1678), the region was again captured by the French in 1674, this time permanently, since it was officially ceded to France by the Treaty of Nijmegen (1678), thus leaving the Holy Roman Empire, and also ending the Habsburg period in the history of Franche-Comté.

=== Province of the Kingdom of France ===
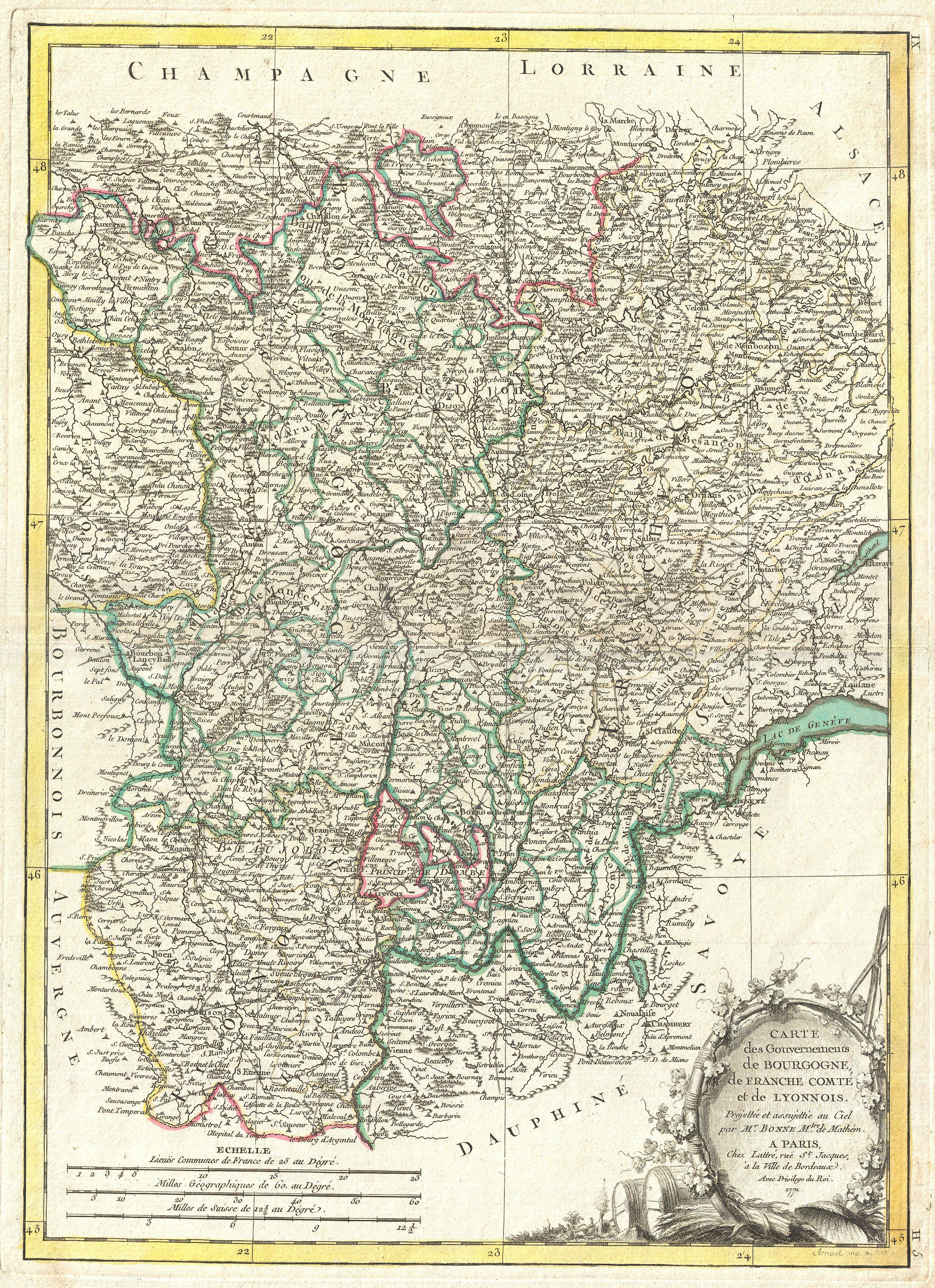
1771 map of Burgundy, Franche-Comté and Lyonnais by Rigobert Bonne

Franche-Comté
- Government of Kingdom of France
- 1668/1674–1790
- Flag Coat of arms

- History
  - Established: 1668/1674
  - Disestablished: 1790
Preceded by
County of Burgundy
Succeeded by
Jura (department)
Haute-Saône
Doubs

France officially annexed the region of Franche-Comté in 1678, but minor enclaves such as Montbéliard remained outside French control.

The Franche-Comté was one of the last parts of France to have serfdom. In 1784, half of the population consisted of serfs, accounting for 400,000 out of the 1 million French serfs. Landowners took one-twelfth of the sale's price if a serf (mainmortable) wanted to sell up. Serfs were not forced to stay on the land, but the lord could claim droit de suite, whereby a peasant who died away from his holding left it to the lord, even if he had heirs. A runaway serf's land was forfeit after ten years. Louis XVI issued a decree banning these practices on 8 August 1779, but the Parlement of Besançon blocked this until 1787.

=== After 1790 ===
The population of the region fell by a fifth from 1851 to 1946, reflecting low French natural growth and migration to more urbanized parts of the country. Most of the decline occurred in Haute-Saône and Jura, which remain among the country's more agriculture-dependent areas.

== Environment ==
This region borders Switzerland and shares much of its architecture, cuisine, and culture with its neighbor. Between the Vosges range of mountains to the north and the Jura range to the south, the landscape consists of rolling cultivated fields, dense pine forest, and rampart-like mountains. The Doubs and Loue valleys, with their timbered houses perched on stilts in the river, and the high valley of Ain, are popular visitor areas. The Région des Lacs is a land of gorges and waterfalls dotted with tiny villages, each with a domed belfry decorated with mosaic of tiles or slates or beaten from metal. The summits of Haut Jura can be seen across Lac Léman (Lake Geneva) and toward the Alps.

Forty percent of the region's GDP is dependent on manufacturing activities, and most of its production is exported. Construction of automobiles and their parts is one of the most buoyant industries there. Forestry exploitation is steadily growing, and 38% of the agriculture is dairy and 17% cattle farming. The region has a large and lucrative cheese-making industry, with 40 million tonnes of cheese produced here each year, much of which is made by fruitières (traditional cheese dairies of Franche-Comté); for instance, Comté cheese comes from this region.

=== Geology ===
- Vosges and Jura coal mining basins
- Franche-Comté saltwater basin

== Principal cities ==
City	Metropolitan area	Urban area	Municipality
Besançon	250,563	135,448	116,676
Montbéliard	160,671	106,486	25,336
Belfort	114,445	81,651	49,519
Dole	65,400	29,916	23,373
Vesoul	59,262	28,707	15,058
Lons-le-Saunier	58,674	26,894	17,459
Pontarlier	30,895	21,760	17,140
Gray	17,295	9,470	5,484
Luxeuil-les-Bains	14,652	12,366	6,821
Champagnole	14,266	9,841	7,916
Lure	12,251	11,135	8,253
Saint-Claude	11,343	10,346	9,732

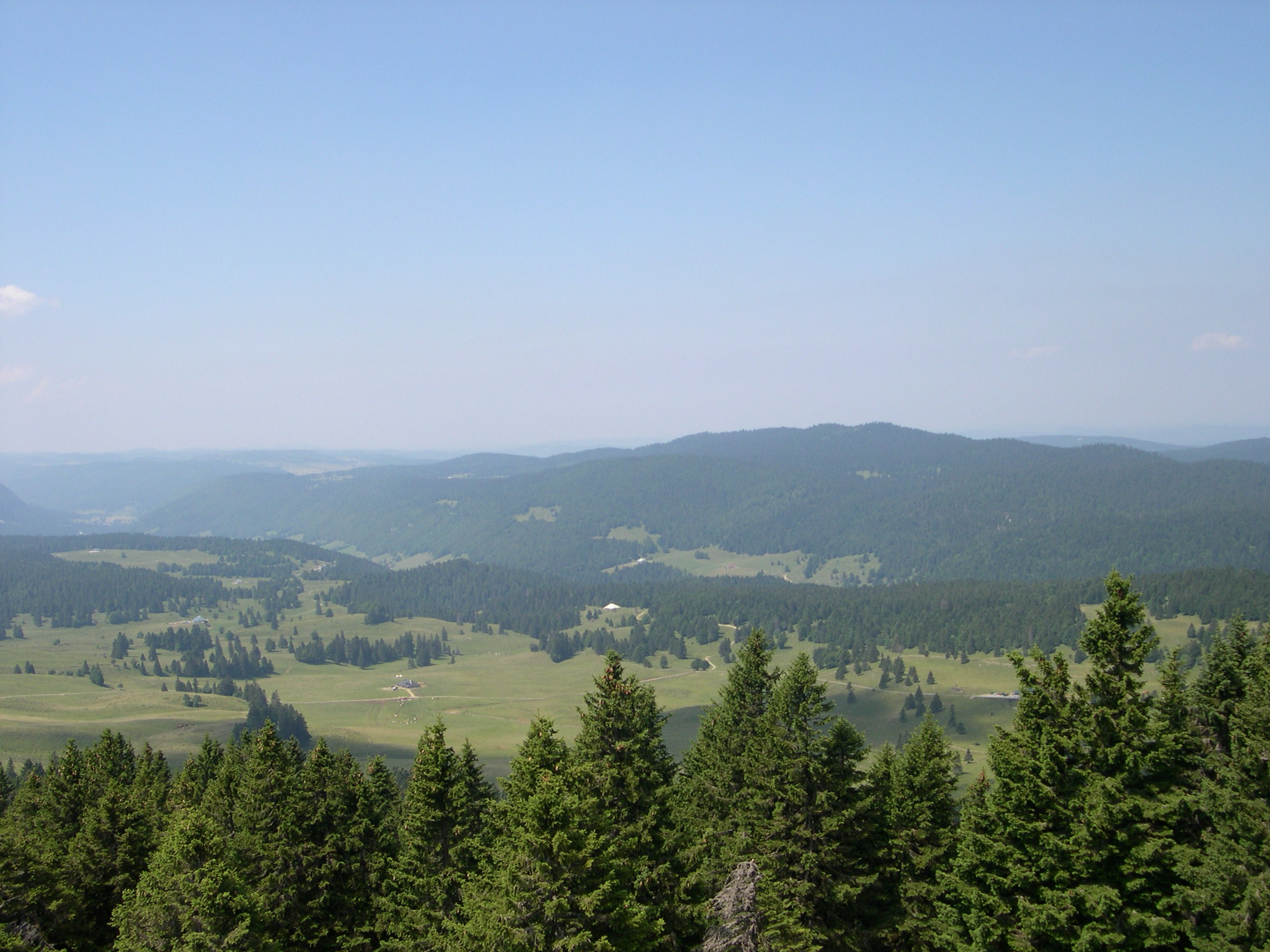
Landscape, Franche-Comté

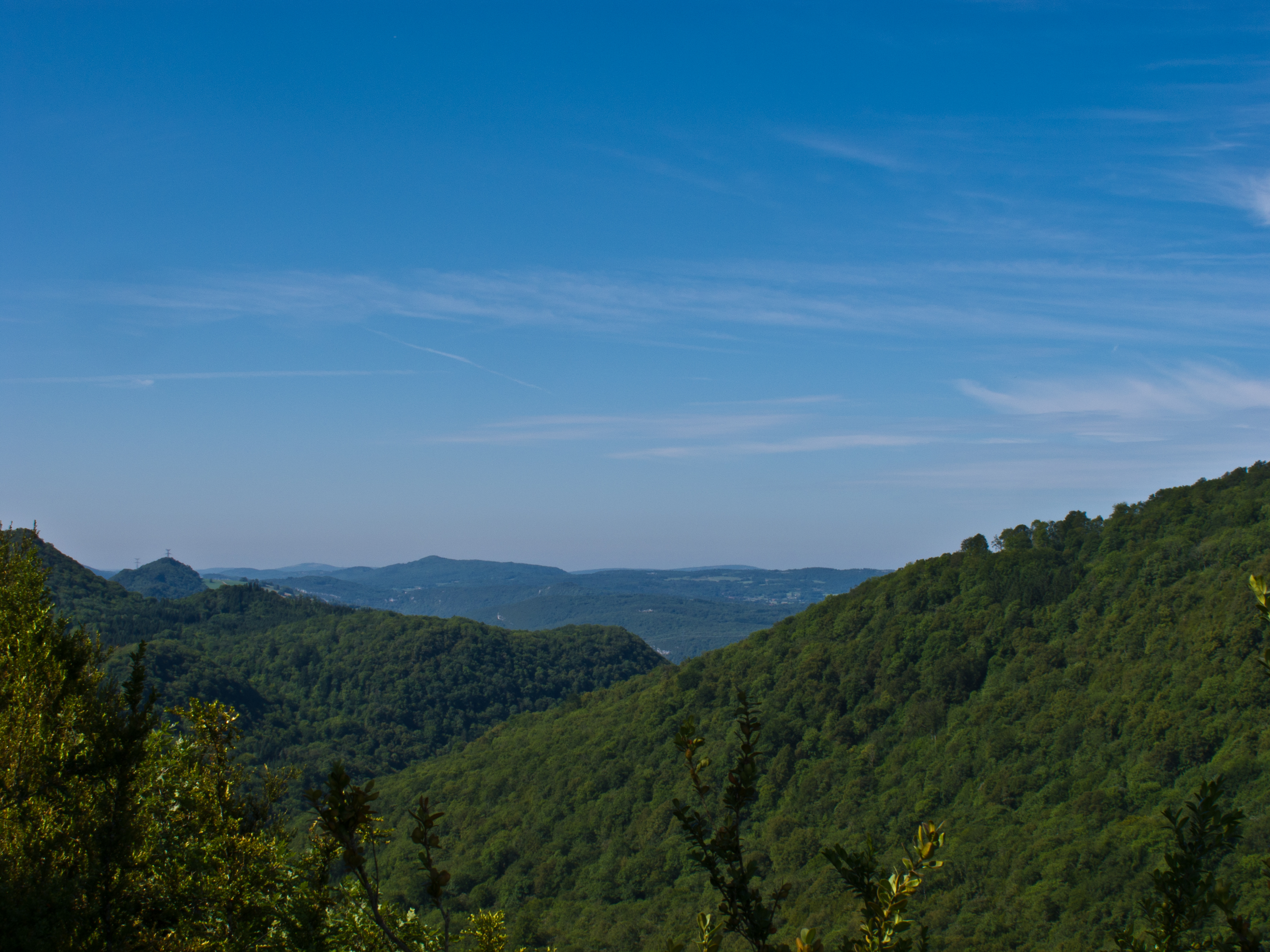
La Petite Montagne, a view from Molard de la Justice

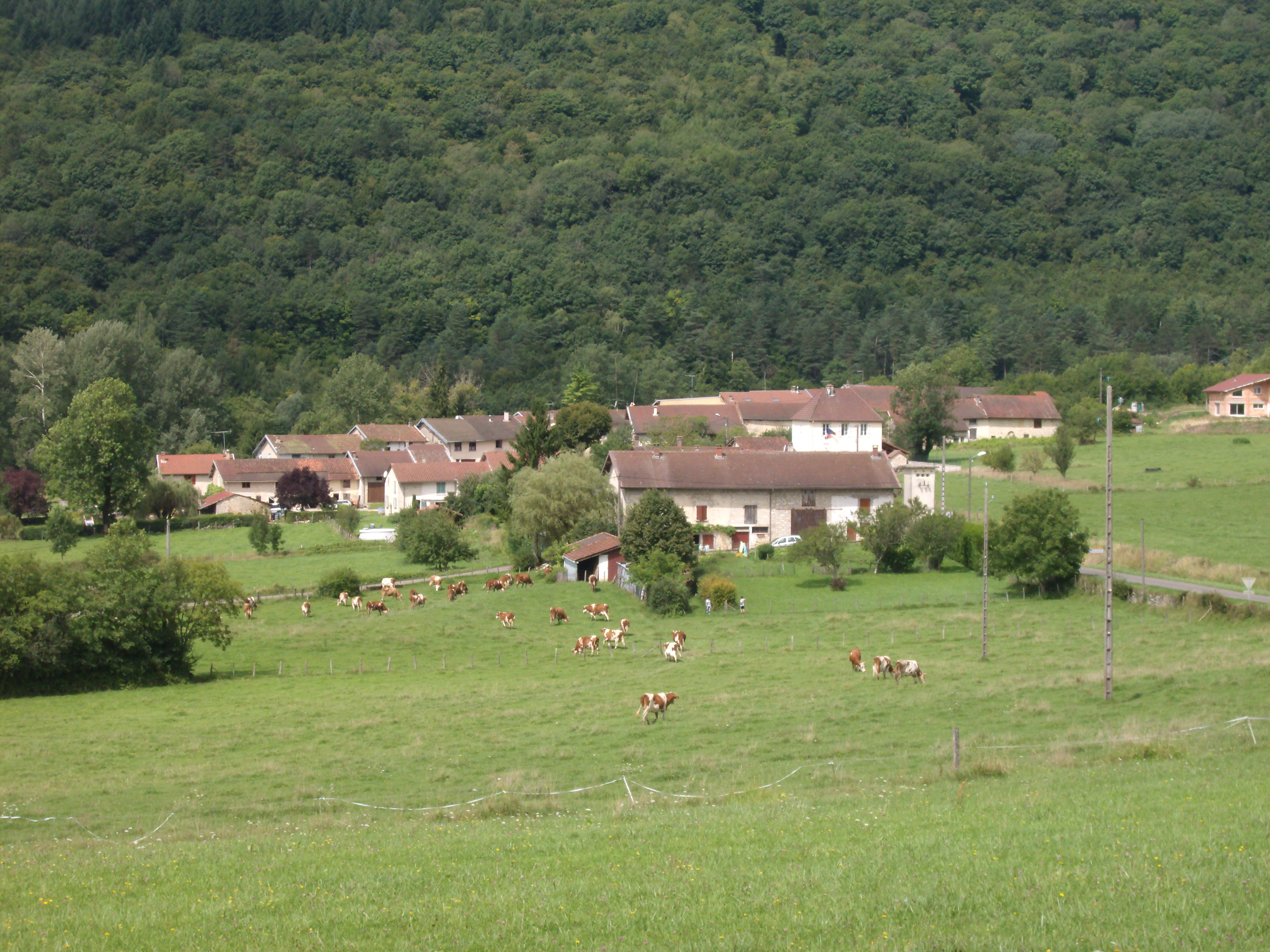
View of Broissia, a commune in the Jura department

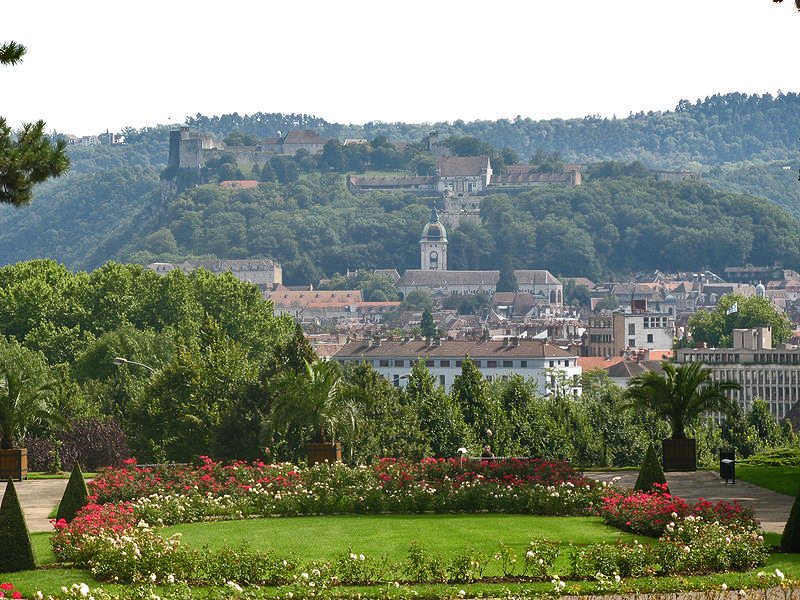
Besançon

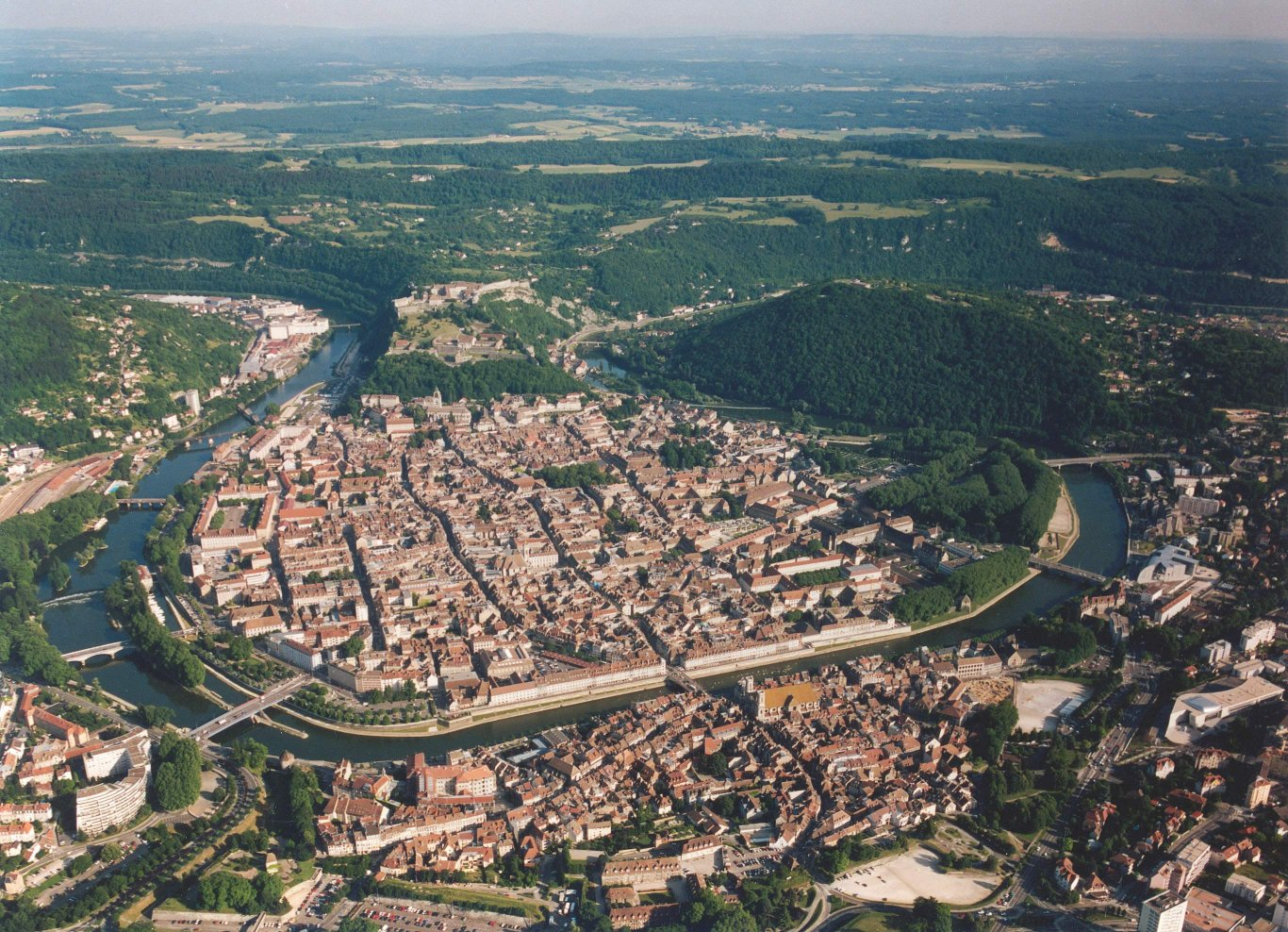
Besançon

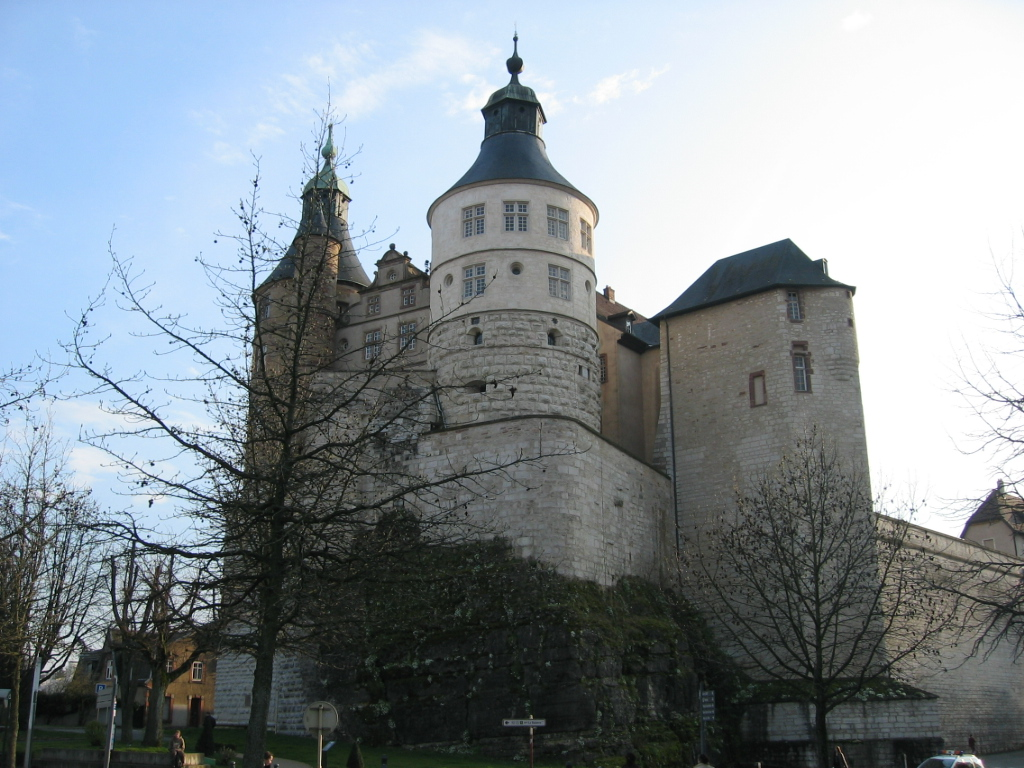
Montbéliard

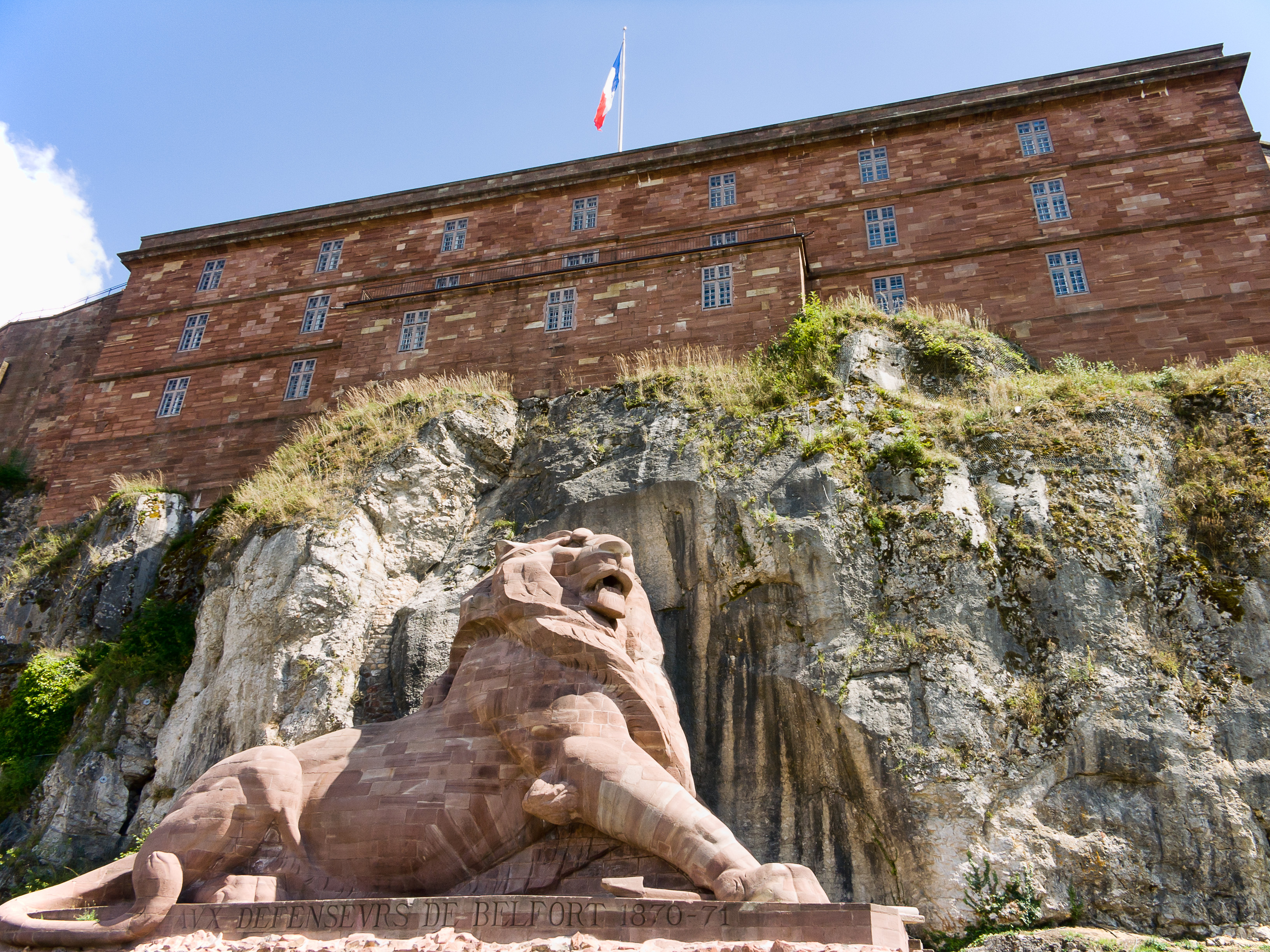
Belfort

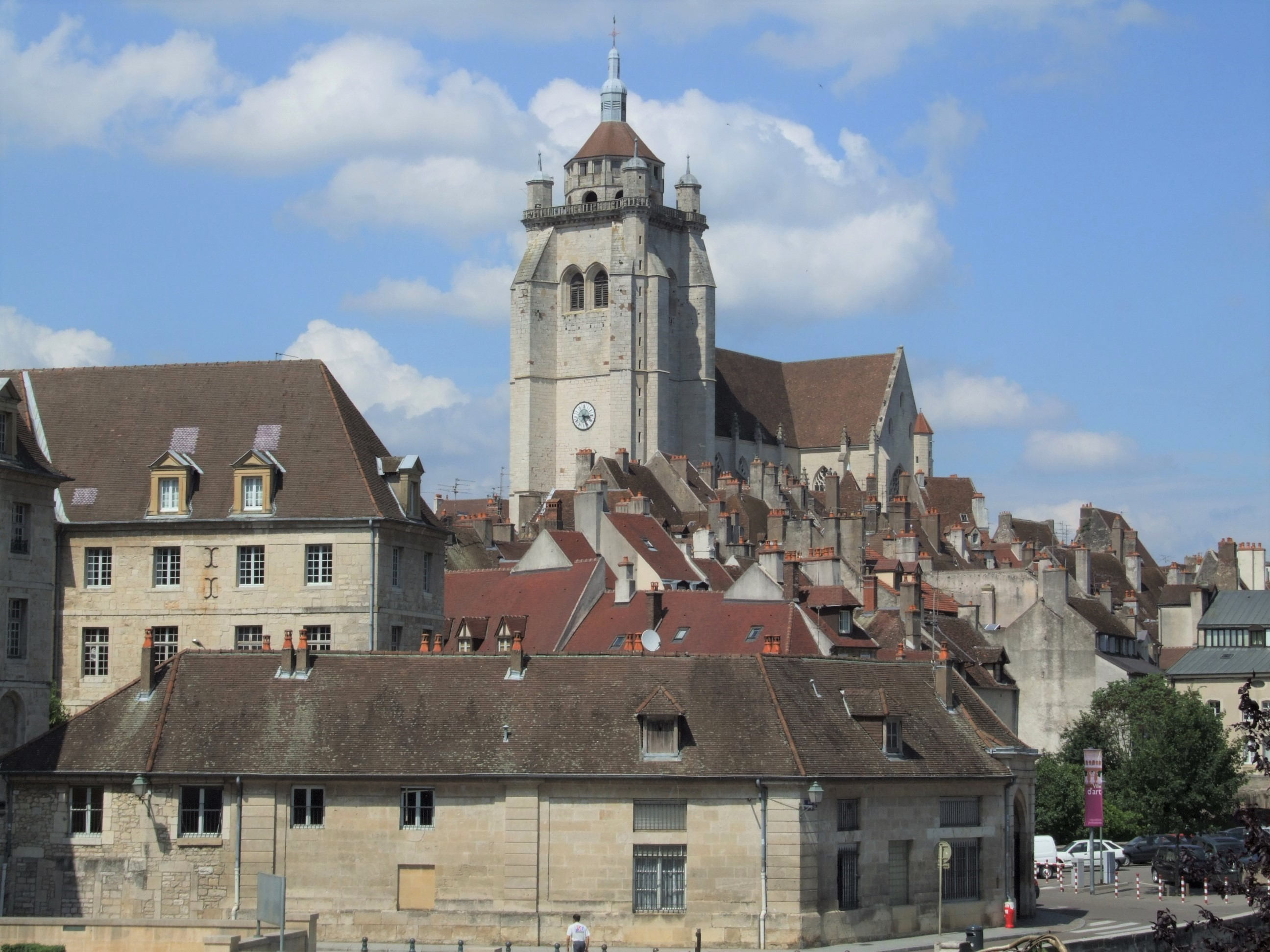
Dole

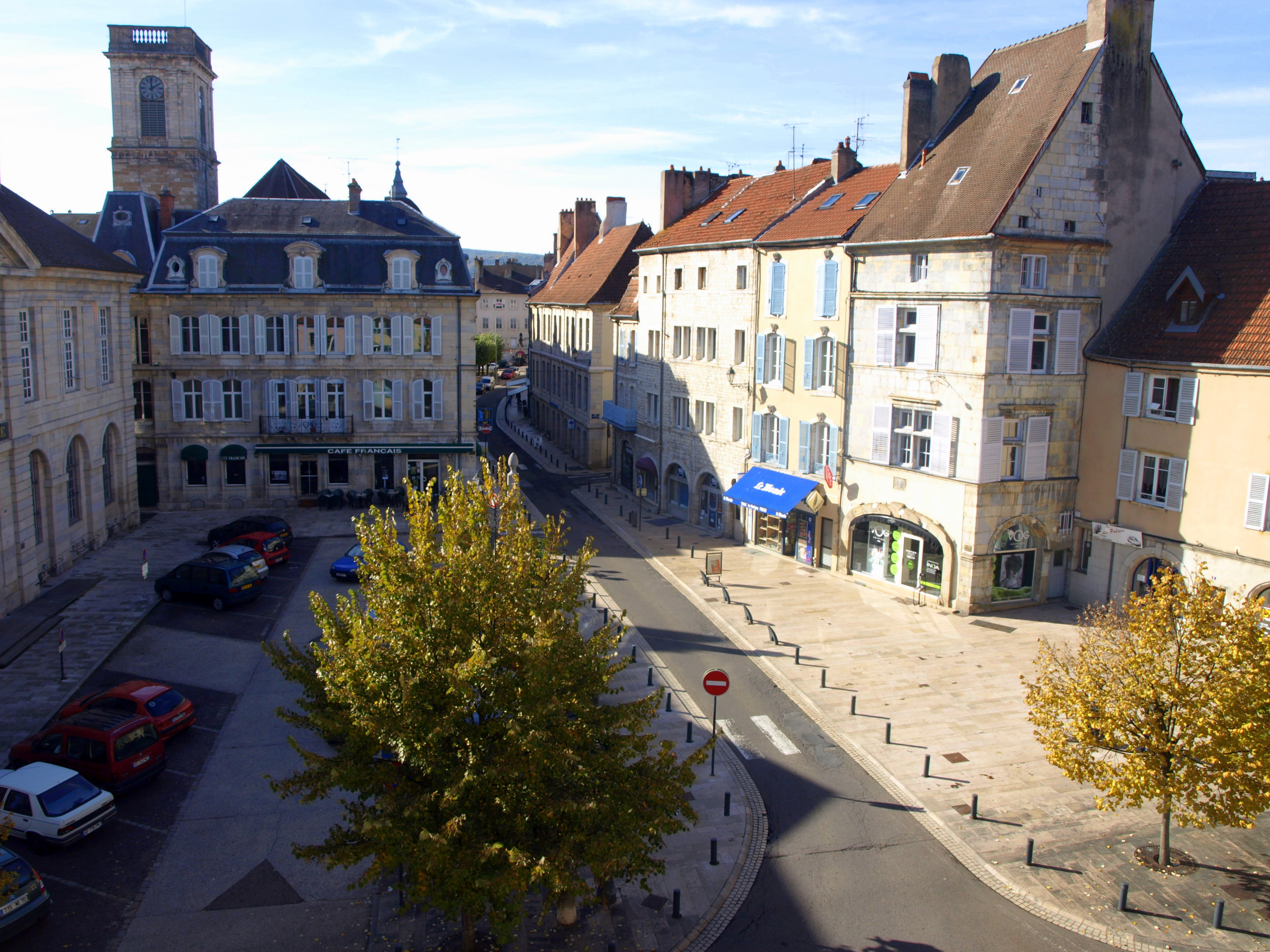
Vesoul

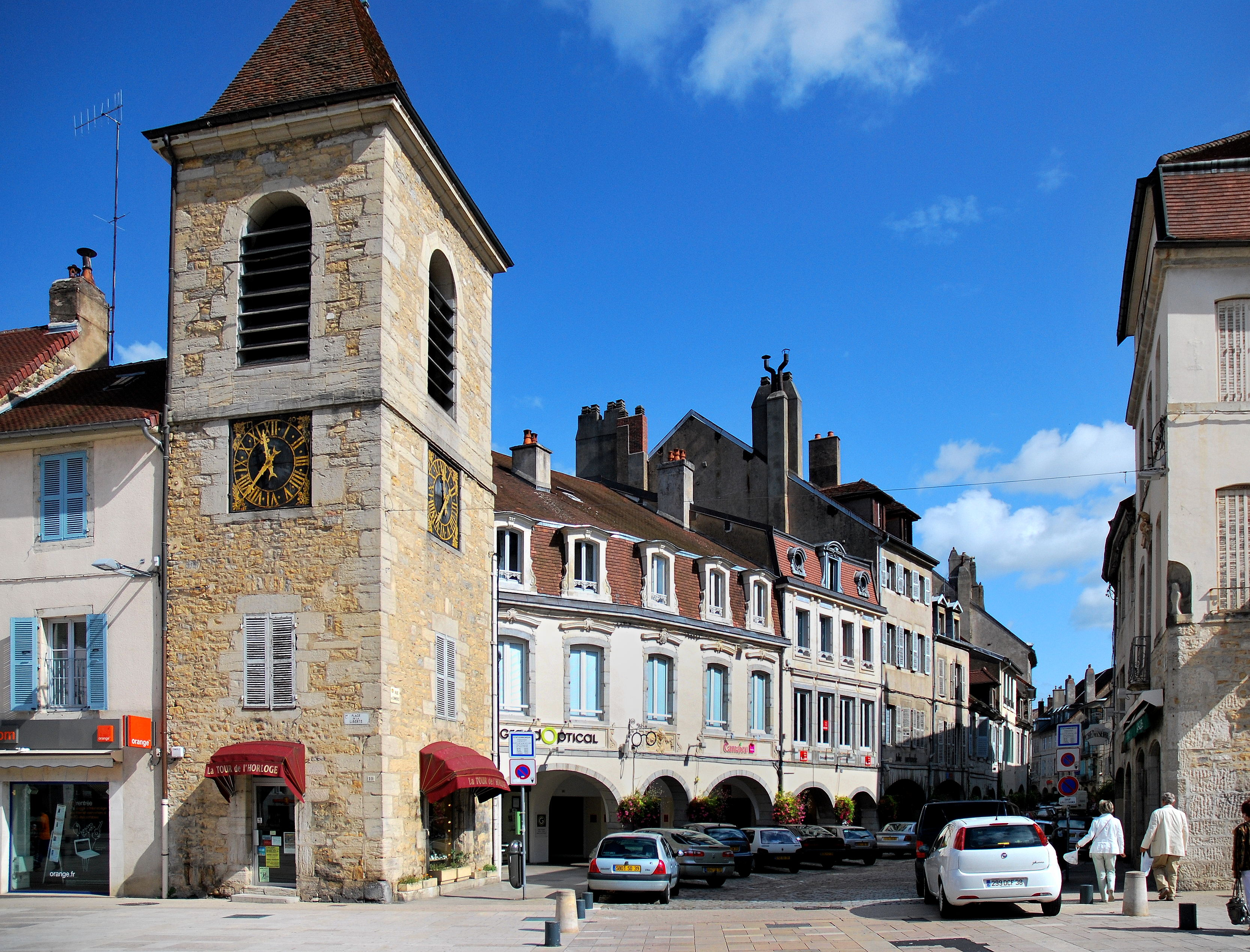
Lons-le-Saunier

== Language ==
Among the regional languages of France, the term Franc-comtois refers to two dialects of two different languages. Franc-comtois is the name of the dialect of Langue d'Oïl spoken by people in the northern part of the region. The dialect of Arpitan has been spoken in its southern part since as early as the thirteenth century (the southern two-thirds of Jura and the southern third of Doubs). Both are recognized as languages of France.

== Education ==
215,178 students were attending education in Franche-Comté at the start of the 2018 school year. The region has potential in the research sector In Besançon, the National School of Mechanics, and Microtechnology (ENSMM) or the UTBM, the University of Technology of Belfort-Montbéliard inBelfort and Montbéliard.

The University of Franche-Comté is mainly located in Besançon. It has 24,000 students spread over six training and research areas (UFR), including five in Besançon and one in Belfort and Montbéliard, two university institutes of technology (IUT) (Besançon-Vesoul and Nord Franche-Comté), 920 students engineers at ENSMM and 2,550 students at UTBM.

== People from Franche-Comté ==
- Raymond Blanc, chef
- Jean-Jacques Boissard, neo-Latin poet
- Paul de Casteljau, mathematician
- Gustave Courbet, painter
- Frank Darabont, filmmaker
- Charles Fourier, philosopher
- Salah Gaham, concierge
- Victor Hugo, poet, playwright, novelist, essayist, visual artist, statesman, human rights activist
- Auguste and Louis Lumière, early filmmakers
- Jean Mairet, dramatist
- Jacques de Molay, last Grandmaster of the Knights Templar
- Charles Nodier, author
- Louis Pasteur, chemist and microbiologist
- Antoine Perrenot de Granvelle, Burgundian statesman, leading minister of the Spanish Habsburgs
- Nicolas Perrenot de Granvelle, minister of justice under Charles V, Holy Roman Emperor
- Pierre-Joseph Proudhon philosopher, socialist
- Jean Baptiste Alexandre Strolz
- Jean-Baptiste-Antoine Suard, journalist
- Hubert-Félix Thiéfaine, singer and songwriter
- Louis Vuitton, designer
- Arnaud Courlet de Vregille, painter

== Typical regional products ==
- Wine: Vin jaune, Arbois
- Cheese: Cancoillotte, Bleu de Gex, Comté, Édel de Cléron, Metton, Morbier, Munster, Vacherin Mont d'Or
- Sausages: Saucisse de Montbéliard, saucisse de Morteau, Gendarme

== See also ==
- Picolaton, imaginary bird of Franche-Comté folklore
- Montbozon–Lure Line

== Sources ==
- Dee, Darryl (2009). Expansion and Crisis in Louis XIV's France: Franche-Comté and Absolute Monarchy, 1674-1715. Rochester, NY: University of Rochester Press. ISBN 978-1-58046-303-4.
- Headley, John M. (1983). The Emperor and His Chancellor: A Study of the Imperial Chancellery Under Gattinara. New York: Cambridge University Press. ISBN 978-0-521-24444-2.
- Hauff, Andrea (2017). "The Kingdom of Upper Burgundy and the East Frankish Kingdom at the beginning of the 10th century". History Compass. 15 (8): 1–12. doi:10.1111/hic3.12396.
- Parker, Geoffrey (2019). Emperor: A New Life of Charles V. New Haven and London: Yale University Press. ISBN 978-0-300-19652-8.
- Prevenier, Walter; Blockmans, Wim (1986). The Burgundian Netherlands. New York: Cambridge University Press. ISBN 978-90-6153-155-5.
- Stein, Robert (2017). Magnanimous Dukes and Rising States: The Unification of the Burgundian Netherlands, 1380–1480. Oxford: Oxford University Press. ISBN 978-0-19-875710-8.
