= Chantecler chicken =

Canadian breed of chicken

Chantecler
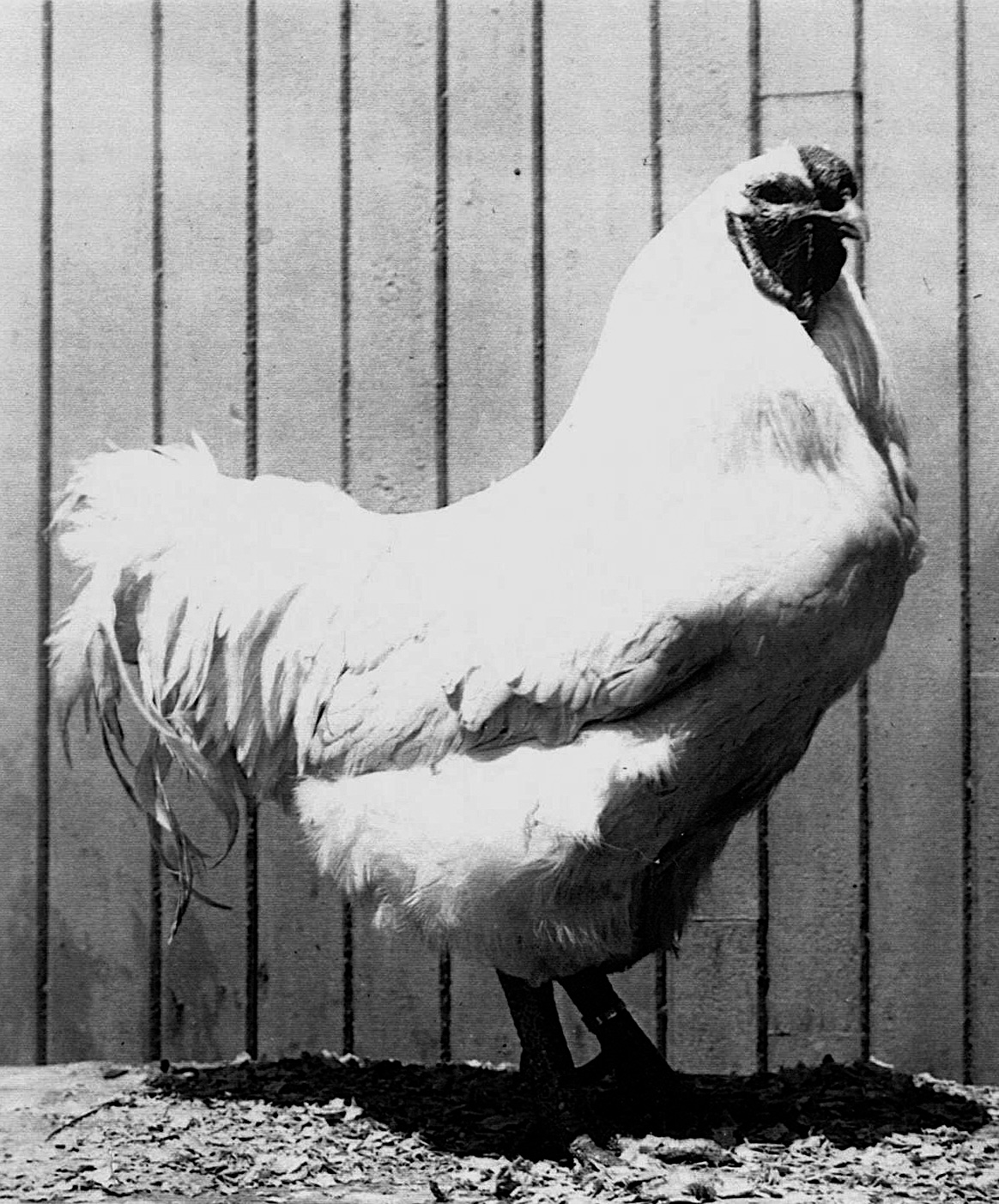
- Cock bird at the Oka Agricultural Institute in 1926

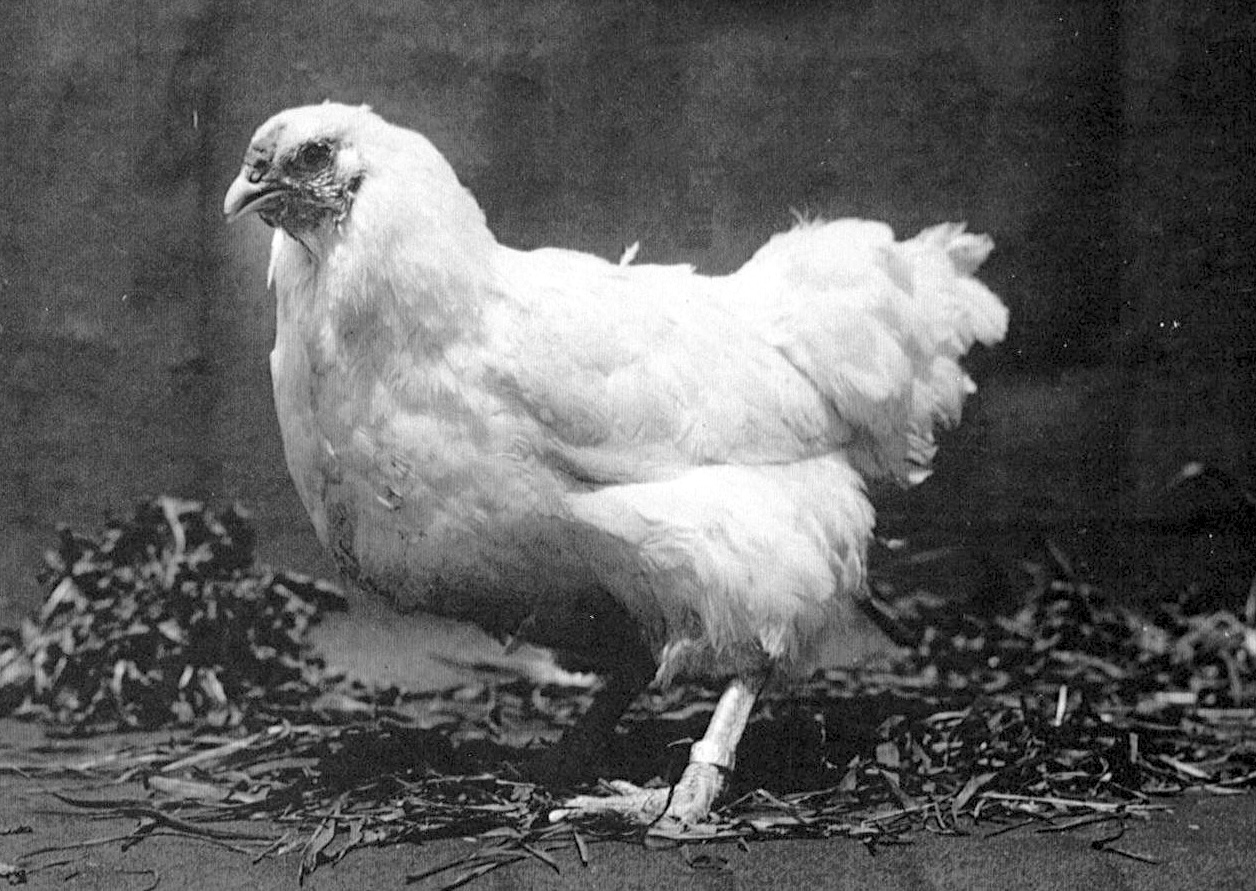
- Hen, 1926
- Conservation status: FAO (2007): critical; DAD-IS (2025): at risk/endangered
- Country of origin: Canada
- Use: dual-purpose, eggs and meat

Traits
- Weight: Male: Large fowl: 3.4–3.9 kg (7–9 lb); Bantam: 950 g (34 oz); Female: Large fowl: 2.0–2.5 kg (4–6 lb); Bantam: 850 g (30 oz)
- Skin color: yellow
- Egg color: light brown
- Comb type: cushion

Classification
- APA: American
- EE: listed, not recognised
- Chicken; Gallus gallus domesticus

The Chantecler is a Canadian breed of dual-purpose chicken, reared for both egg and meat production. It was bred in the early twentieth century at the Oka Agricultural Institute in Oka, Quebec. It is characterised by close-fitting feathering, a small or vestigial cushion-shaped comb and small or vestigial wattles, all of which make it more resistant than many other breeds to the extreme cold of the Canadian winter.

It is an endangered breed, and its conservation status is listed in DAD-IS as "at risk/endangered". It is thought that there are some 1000 of the birds in the province of Québec, with small numbers elsewhere in Canada. It is the only chicken breed originating in Canada, and one of three livestock breeds originating in the Province of Quebec – the others being the Canadienne breed of cattle and the Canadian Horse.

== History ==
The Chantecler was bred from about 1908 by a Cistercian monk, Wilfrid Châtelain, at the Oka Agricultural Institute, the agricultural school of the Trappist Abbey of Notre-Dame du Lac in Oka, Quebec.

Châtelain started with two crosses: a white Plymouth Rock hen with a Rhode Island cock, and a white Leghorn hen with a Cornish cock. Cocks of the first cross were then used on hens from the second, and pullets from this mating were bred to a white Plymouth cock; after about ten years of rigorous selection, the characteristics had become stable. The Chantecler was first shown in 1918, and in 1921 was added to the Standard of Perfection of the American Poultry Association.

In the 1930s a similar but unrelated breed was generated by crossing partridge Wyandottes and Cochins with dark Cornish and rose-combed red Leghorn stock to produce a chicken more adapted to free-range conditions. This variant was admitted to the Standard in 1935 as the partridge Chantecler. A buff variant, created in the 1950s, is not recognised. The bantam, in both white and partridge, was added to the American standard in 1960.

In 1979, the extinction of the Chantecler was publicized when what was thought to be the last rooster of the breed died at the Department of Animal and Poultry Science of the University of Saskatchewan. However, some birds remained in a few small farms.

In 2007 the Chantecler was thought to be on the path to extinction, with an estimated remaining population in Canada of 1000 to 1500 birds. A population of 500 to 1100 was reported to DAD-IS for 2017, and in 2025 its conservation status was listed there as "at risk/endangered"; in the same year it was listed as "watch" by the Livestock Conservancy of the United States.

== Characteristics ==
The Chantecler was bred to be a dual-purpose chicken – suitable both as a layer of eggs and as a meat bird – and to perform well in the cold climate of Canada. It is of medium size: body weights are in the range 2 to 2.5 kg for hens and 3.4 to 3.9 kg for cocks. The corresponding weights for bantams are 850 g and 950 g.

The small cushion comb and vestigial wattles make the chickens less vulnerable to frost-bite than chickens of other breeds, while the thick close feathering and dense down help to retain body heat. The skin and shanks are yellow, as is the beak in the white variant; in the partridge it is horn-coloured.

== Use ==
Hens may be expected to lay about 200 light brown eggs per year, with an average weight of approximately 60 g.
