= Oka cheese =

Semi-soft washed rind cheese originally from Oka, Quebec

Oka
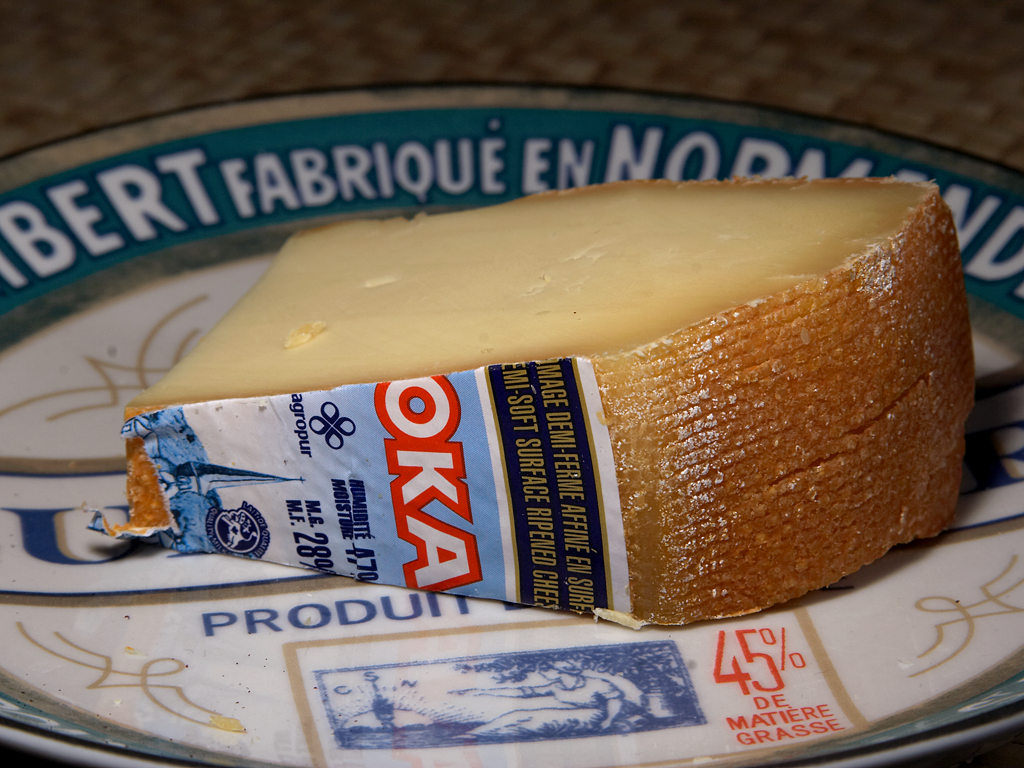
- Oka Cheese
- Country of origin: Canada
- Region: The Laurentides
- Town: Oka
- Source of milk: Cow
- Pasteurised: Sometimes
- Texture: semi-soft/creamy
- Aging time: 1–2 months

Oka is a semi-soft washed rind cheese that was originally manufactured by Trappist monks located in Oka, Quebec, Canada. The cheese is named after the town. It has a distinct flavour and aroma, and is still manufactured in Oka, although now by a commercial company. The recipe was sold in 1981 by Les Pères Trappistes to the Agropur cooperative.

It was also manufactured by Trappist Monks at the Our Lady of the Prairies Monastery, located 8 miles southeast of Holland, Manitoba. A small Manitoba producer learned the process from Brother Albéric, but stopped making unpasteurized Trappist cheese in 2019 because of the cost of provincial regulations.

Brother Alphonse Juin arrived at the Notre-Dame du Lac Monastery in Quebec in 1893 with a recipe for Port-du-Salut cheese. He "tweaked and adjusted" the recipe, and Oka was born. Since that time, Quebec has become a major producer of Canadian Cheese.

Oka cheese has a pungent aroma and soft creamy flavour, sometimes described as nutty and fruity. The cheese, which is made from cow's milk, is covered with a copper-orange, hand-washed rind. Its distinct flavour sets it apart from more common cheeses such as colby and cheddar, and does not go through a cheddaring process.

There are four types of Oka cheese:

- Regular is pasteurized cow's milk. It is ripened for four weeks. Several varieties of the regular version are also available including Ashed and Mushrooms and Truffle, as well as a limited edition Maple flavour.
- Classic is pasteurized and ripened for two months.
- Providence is of a much more creamy and soft texture than either "Classic" or "Regular".
- Light is similar to "Regular", but with a lower percentage of fat and always pasteurized.
- A Swiss style Oka has been introduced in regular and smoked varieties.
- An Oka-branded Raclette cheese is also available.

== History ==
Oka cheese was heavily influenced by the work of the monks of the Cistercian Abbey of Notre-Dame du Lac (fr. Abbaye Cistercienne d'Oka). Within a few years, through an affiliation with the Université de Montréal, the monastery created an agricultural school. Frequently called the Abbaye Notre-Dame-du-Lac, the Trappist monastery became well known for its Port-Salut cheese, made from a Breton recipe brought with them from France.

== See also ==
- Trappista cheese – Type of cheese developed in Europe, a Trappist cheese from Europe
- List of cheeses
