= Canadian cheese =

Overview of cheese production in Canada

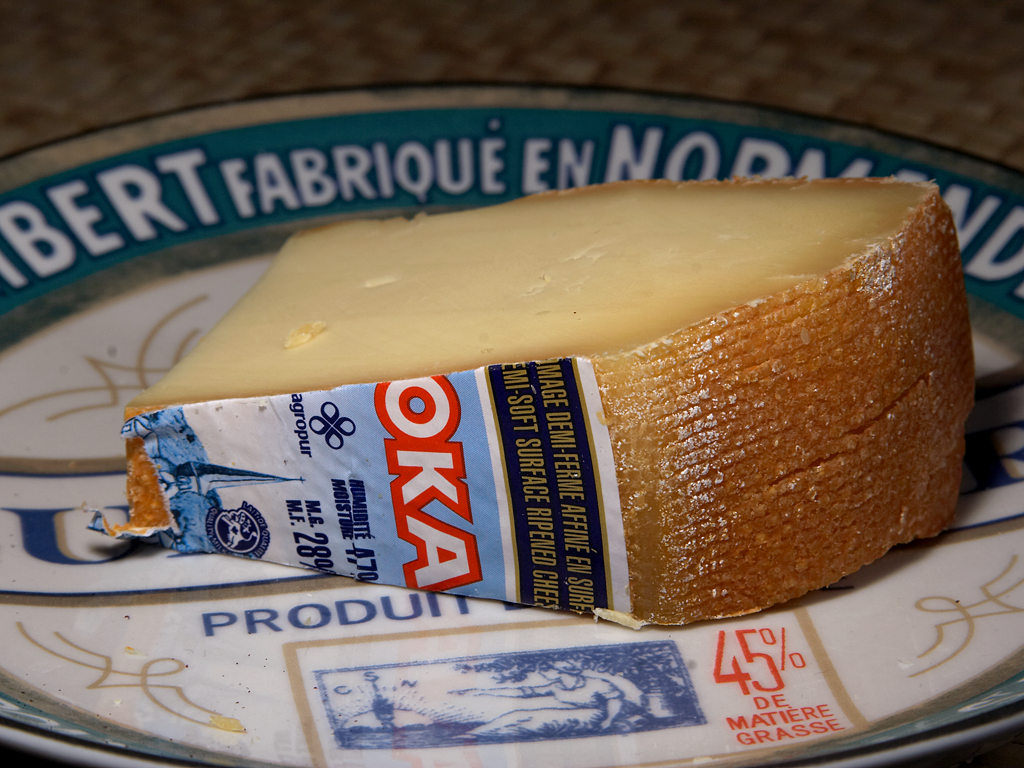
Oka cheese is a semi-soft washed rind cheese that was originally manufactured by Trappist monks located in Oka, Quebec, Canada.

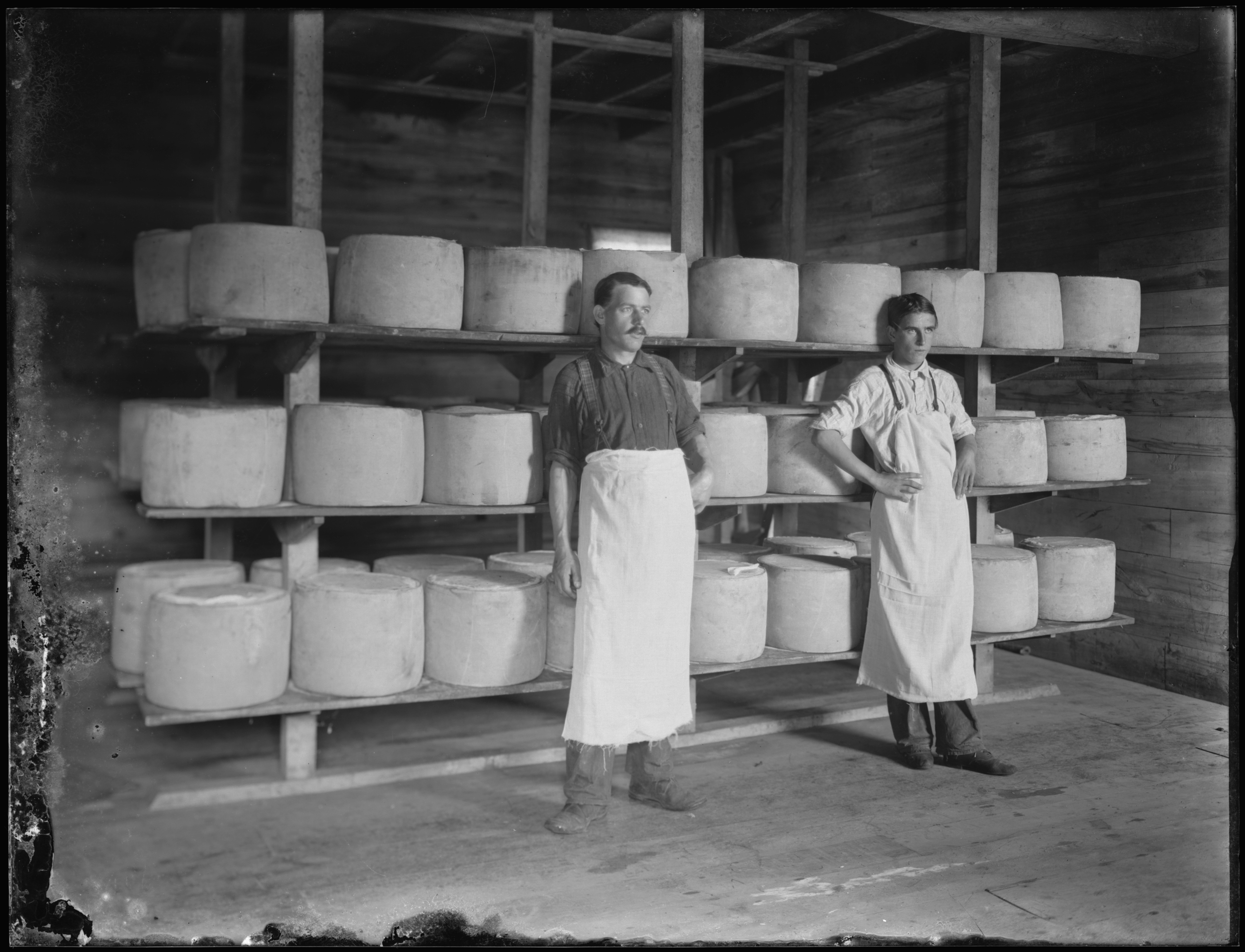
Inside a cheese factory in Eastern Ontario, between 1895 and 1910

Cheese has been produced in Canada since Samuel de Champlain brought cows from Normandy in either 1608 or 1610, The Canadienne breed of cattle is thought to descend from these and other early Norman imports. New France developed soft, unripened cheeses characteristic of its metropole, France. Later British settlers and Loyalists fleeing the American Revolution introduced British styles such as cheddar.

== History ==
Canadian cheeses were almost entirely farm-made until 1864 when an American, Harvey Farrington started buying Canadian milk in commercial quantities necessary for industrial cheese making. The first commercial factory "The Pioneer" was set up in Norwich, Ontario, in 1864.

Following a wheat midge outbreak in Canada in the mid-nineteenth century, farmers in the province of Ontario began to convert to dairy farming in large numbers, and cheddar cheese was their main exportable product (before electric refrigeration was invented), even being exported back to the cheese's country of origin, England. In one year, 1867, the year of Canadian Confederation, 200 cheese factories were established in Ontario alone. In 1881, Édouard-André Barnard created North America's first cheese-making school in Saint-Denis-De La Bouteillerie, Québec. A dairy school (Canada's first) opened in 1892 in Saint-Hyacinthe, Québec, and in 1901, produced experimental Canadian versions of Camembert and Feta. By the turn of the twentieth century, there were 1,242 cheddar factories in Ontario, and cheddar had become Canada's second largest export behind timber. Cheddar exports totaled 234,000,000 pounds (106,000,000 kg) in 1904, but by 2012, Canada was a net importer of cheese, and a manufactured cheese product "Kraft Dinner" macaroni and cheese had become Canada's most popular grocery product and de facto national dish. James Lewis Kraft grew up on a dairy farm in Ontario, before moving to Chicago. As writer Sarah Champman writes, "Although we cannot wholly lay the decline of cheese craft in Canada at the feet of James Lewis Kraft, it did correspond with the rise of Kraft's processed cheese empire."

== Contemporary cheese production ==
Canadian cheeses are classified into six categories per their moisture content, which are firm, soft, semi-soft, fresh, blue-veined and hard, with most cheeses being classified as firm, soft, or semi-soft. Canada presently produces over 1,050 varieties and brands of cheese. More than half of the cheese manufacturers are located in Québec. The Sélection Caseus is an annual contest for Québec cheeses that began in 1999. It awards gold, silver and bronze prizes each year as well as prizes in diverse categories.

== Quebec ==
Cheesemaking took off in Quebec in the late 19th century, following the Canadian–American Reciprocity Treaty (in force between 1854 and 1866). At that time, Quebeckers considered cheese a luxury, and did not eat it regularly. Quebec cheese had a poor reputation in Britain; British consumers apparently regarded its supposedly Catholic terroir as disqualifying. Indeed, Quebec undertook a special export program in 1892 "for the purpose of illustrating … that cheese from Quebec were [sic] just as good, in many cases, as cheese from Ontario". As late as World War I, Quebec cheese was sold in the United Kingdom as Ontario cheese.

Joseph-Édouard Caron, minister of agriculture in the early 20th century, instituted an inspection regime for cheese and butter factories in the province.

As of 2013, approximately 700 varieties of cheese were produced in Quebec, by over 100 cheesemakers. Quebec experienced a boom in cheese manufacturing at the turn of the millennium; numerous cheesemakers set up shop between 2001 and 2008.

== Exports ==
In the 2020s, Canadian artisanal cheesemakers began expanding into the United States, with several producers receiving recognition at American cheese competitions. At the 2024 American Cheese Society competition, Canadian cheeses won more than 20 medals. However, President Trump's introduction of a 50% U.S. tariff on Canadian cheese in 2025 disrupted this growth, prompting some cheesemakers to suspend exports or reconsider plans to enter the American market. The tariffs also increased costs for American importers and retailers, raising concerns about higher consumer prices.

== See also ==
- Canadian cuisine
- List of cheeses
- Poutine

== Sources ==
- Boulianne, Manon (2013). "Artisans du pays et imaginaires fromagers : la qualification des fromages fins du Québec comme produits de terroir". Anthropologie et Sociétés (in French). 37 (2): 213–231. doi:10.7202/1017913ar. ISSN 0702-8997.
- Saint-Pierre, Jacques (1997). Histoire de la Coopérative fédérée de Québec: l'industrie de la terre (in French). Presses Université Laval. ISBN 978-2-89224-268-3.
