= Saint-Paulin =

Saint Paulin or Saint-Paulin may refer to:

- Paulinus of Nola, (c. 354–431), Latin poet and letter-writer
- Saint-Paulin, Quebec, a municipality in Canada
- Saint-Paulin cheese, a type of cheese
