= Pied-De-Vent =

Cheese produced in Quebec, Canada

Le Pied de Vent
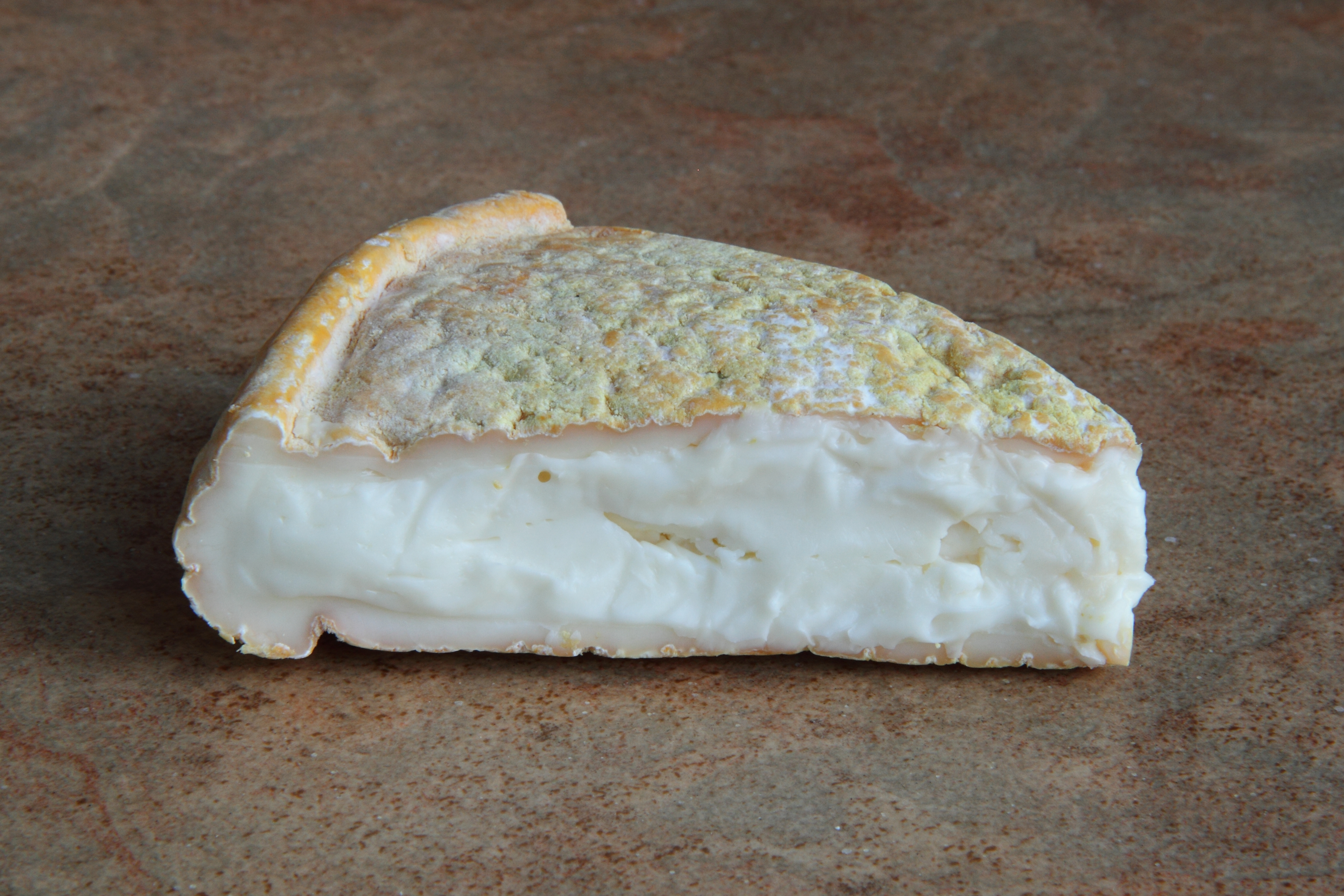
- Country of origin: Canada
- Region: Magdalen Islands, Quebec
- Source of milk: Cows
- Texture: Soft
- Fat content: 27%
- Weight: 1 kg
- Aging time: 60 days

Le Pied-De-Vent is a raw cow's milk cheese from the Magdalen Islands region in Quebec, Canada. This soft cheese is produced by La Fromagerie du Pied-de-Vent. Pied-de-Vent is made with milk from Canadienne cattle. Its name comes from a French-Canadian expression meaning "the sun's rays piercing through the clouds."

== More information ==
- Type: soft paste, raw milk
- Manufacturer: Fromagerie du Pied-De-Vent
- Fat content: 27%
- Humidity content: 50%

== See also ==
- List of cheeses
