= Trappista cheese =

Type of cheese developed in Europe

Coordinates: 49.9819°N 4.3375°E

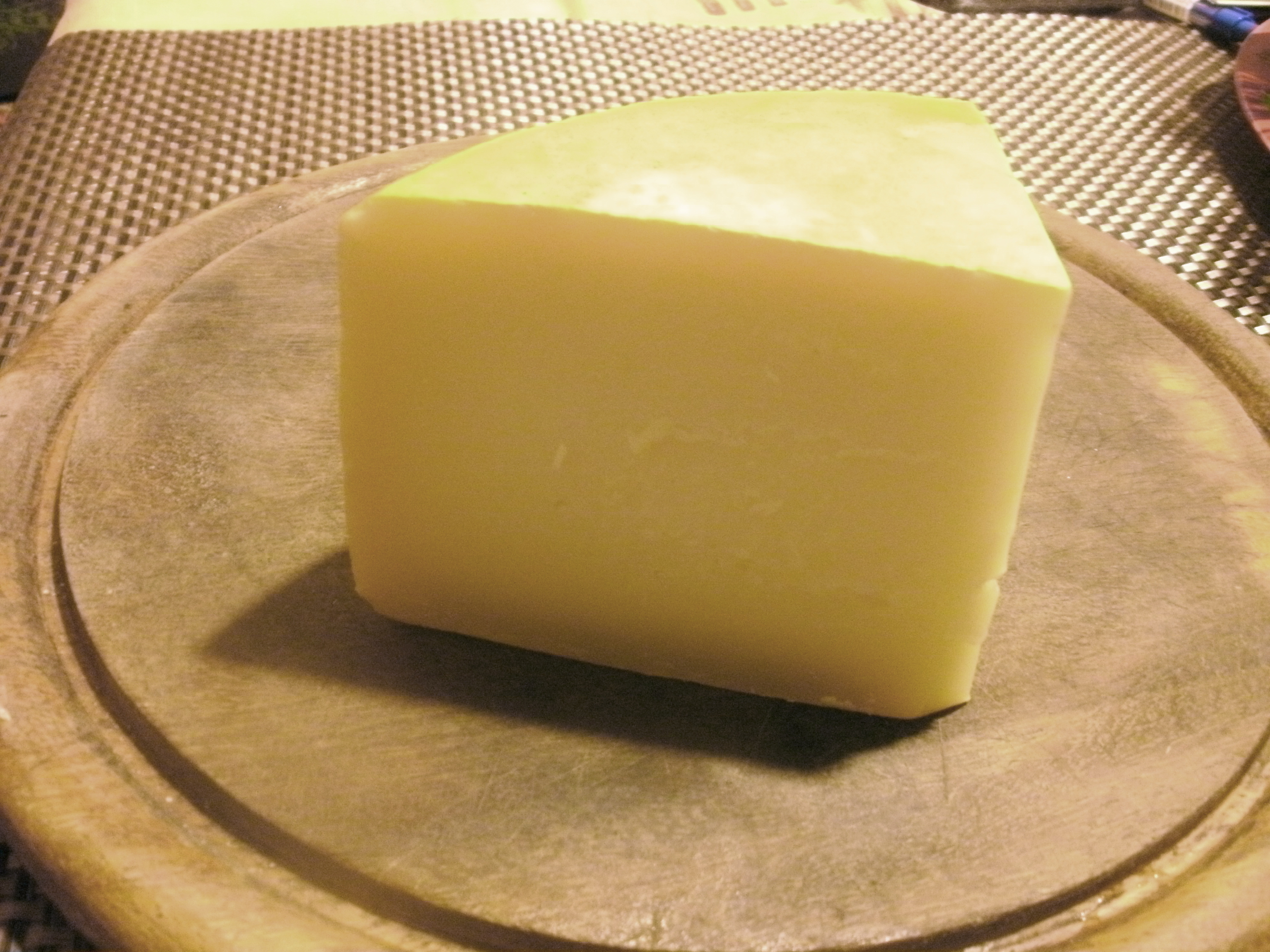
- A piece of Trappista cheese from Bosnia
- Country of origin: France / Bosnia and Herzegovina
- Region: Mayenne
- Town: Clermont-Ferrand
- Source of milk: Cows
- Pasteurised: No
- Texture: Semi-hard

Trappista (Croatian: Trapist sir) (Serbian: Трапист сир) is a traditional semi-hard cow's-milk cheese made in France, Belgium, Bosnia and Herzegovina and Hungary. It was created by the Trappist monks of Port-du-Salut Abbey in France.

== History ==
The origins of the cheese can be traced back to the 18th-century monks of the French abbey of Port-du-Salut. The secret recipe found its way to Bosnia and Herzegovina with the arrival of Cistercian Trappists and establishment of Mariastern Abbey, Banja Luka in 1869. The monks lent portions of their name, Trapisti, to the entire neighborhood, and left a prominent legacy in the area through the production of both this famous cheese and a beer.

Cheese with the same name has also been mass produced in Hungary since the 1960s, optimized to efficiently use milk leftovers from butter and quark production. It remains very popular today, but the recipe does not resemble the traditional French Trappista.

== Production and characteristic ==
Trappista is based on a secret recipe but is also produced on an industrial scale. The cheese melts easily and has a mild flavor. It has a pale yellowish color with sparsely distributed holes of 3–5 mm. It is typically packaged in red plastic foil. Typical packages include 1.5 kg large and 1/2 kg small "wheels", as well as various slices and blocks.

The original French recipe is still manufactured today, under the trademark name of Port-Salut or the common name of Saint-Paulin.

== Popularity and consumption ==
Trappista is very popular in Bosnia and Herzegovina, as well as in Hungary and Serbia. This cheese is best consumed with fruits, wine, or as a melted topping on hot foods. In Hungary, the Trappista cheese is mass produced and this version significantly differs from the original recipe.

== See also ==
- List of Bosnia and Herzegovina cheeses
- Oka cheese, a Trappist cheese from Canada
- List of cheeses
