= Vlašić cheese =

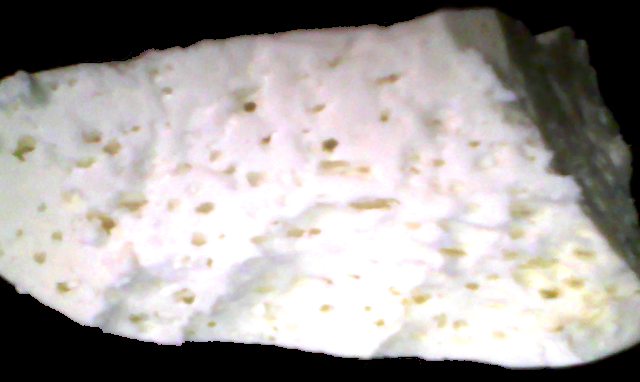
- Country of origin: Bosnia and Herzegovina
- Region: Central Bosnia
- Town: Travnik
- Source of milk: Sheep's, also cow's and mixtures
- Pasteurised: No
- Texture: white, medium hard
- Fat content: low
- Dimensions: not defined
- Aging time: 60 to 90 days

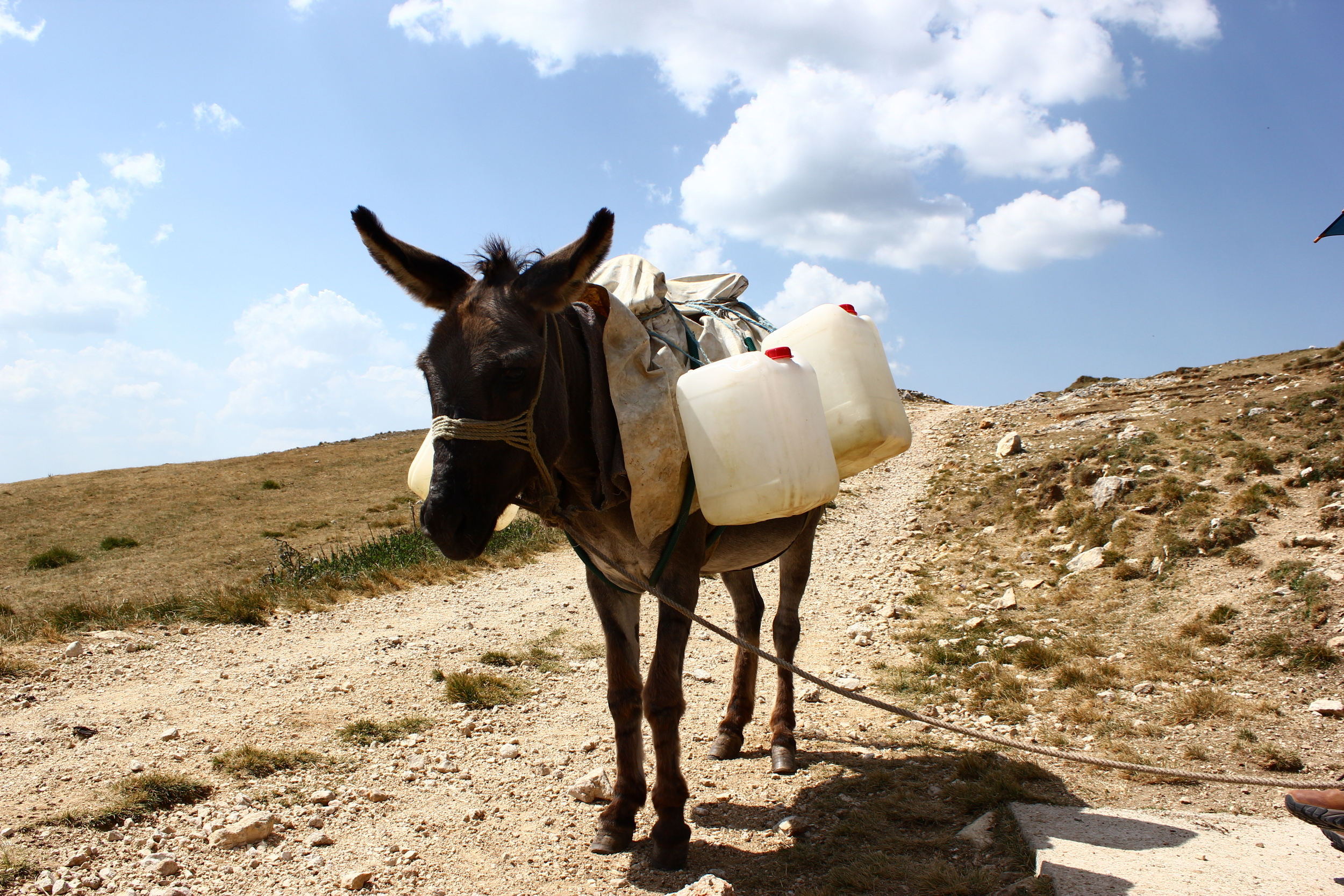
Donkey on the Vlašić mountain, carrying canisters of sheep's milk.

Vlašić cheese (Serbo-Croatian: Vlašićki sir / Влашићки сир) or Travnik cheese (Serbo-Croatian: Travnički sir / Травнички сир) is a brined mostly low-fat white cheese made from sheep-milk. Cheese originating from the mountain of Vlašić, just above the town of Travnik in central Bosnia and Herzegovina. Depending on amount of brine (salty water) the cheese is kept in, its texture and taste can vary but is mostly dry and quite salty.

== History ==
The toponym Vlašić (mountain name) derived from the name Vlasi (Serbo-Croatian for Vlachs), historically used in Bosnia and Herzegovina for its transhumant population. Academics like late Marko Vego believe that the Vlachs, as remnant of the Roman Empire, came up with a recipe for the trademarks of product of the mountain and the region, namely the Vlašić cheese, some time around 1000 AD or earlier. Henceforth, by perfecting the recipe, the Vlachs passed on the tradition to other cattle breeders from the surrounding mountains.

In its 1953 handbook "Cheese Varieties", the United States Department of Agriculture described Travnik cheese as originating in Albania in the early 19th century, where it was known as Arnautski sir. The cheese later spread to Yugoslavia, where it became known as Travnik.

== Production and characteristics ==
Vlašić cheese is a white cheese that matures in brine. It is originally made from fresh sheep milk, but of recently also cow milk is used, or a mix of both varieties, and then left to ripen for two to three months.

The cheese is brined and mostly low-fat. It is white in color, and can either have small irregular holes scattered in it, or be solid without holes. Depending on the amount of brine the cheese is kept in, its texture and taste can vary, but drained it turns mostly dry and quite salty in taste. The milk has a special flavor that comes from the variety of different herbs the sheep are eating when grazing on Vlašić and the surrounding mountains.

== Popularity and consumption ==
Today this cheese is produced throughout Bosnia and Herzegovina, but is regarded as particular traditions of the region of Central Bosnia, Vlašić mountain and town of Travnik. In addition to the cheese, two other particular trademarks of the region exist, the Tornjak dog and Pramenka sheep. The Tornjak is believed to have existed for more than a millennium, bred to guard people and its livestock from wolves and bears. Its etymology is connected to Neo-Latin torni acca ("turn here").

The Vlašić cheese was awarded many prizes over the years, with gold medal won at 12th International Exhibition of Cheese in Austria (Die internationale Käsiade) in 2014 among the most recent ones.

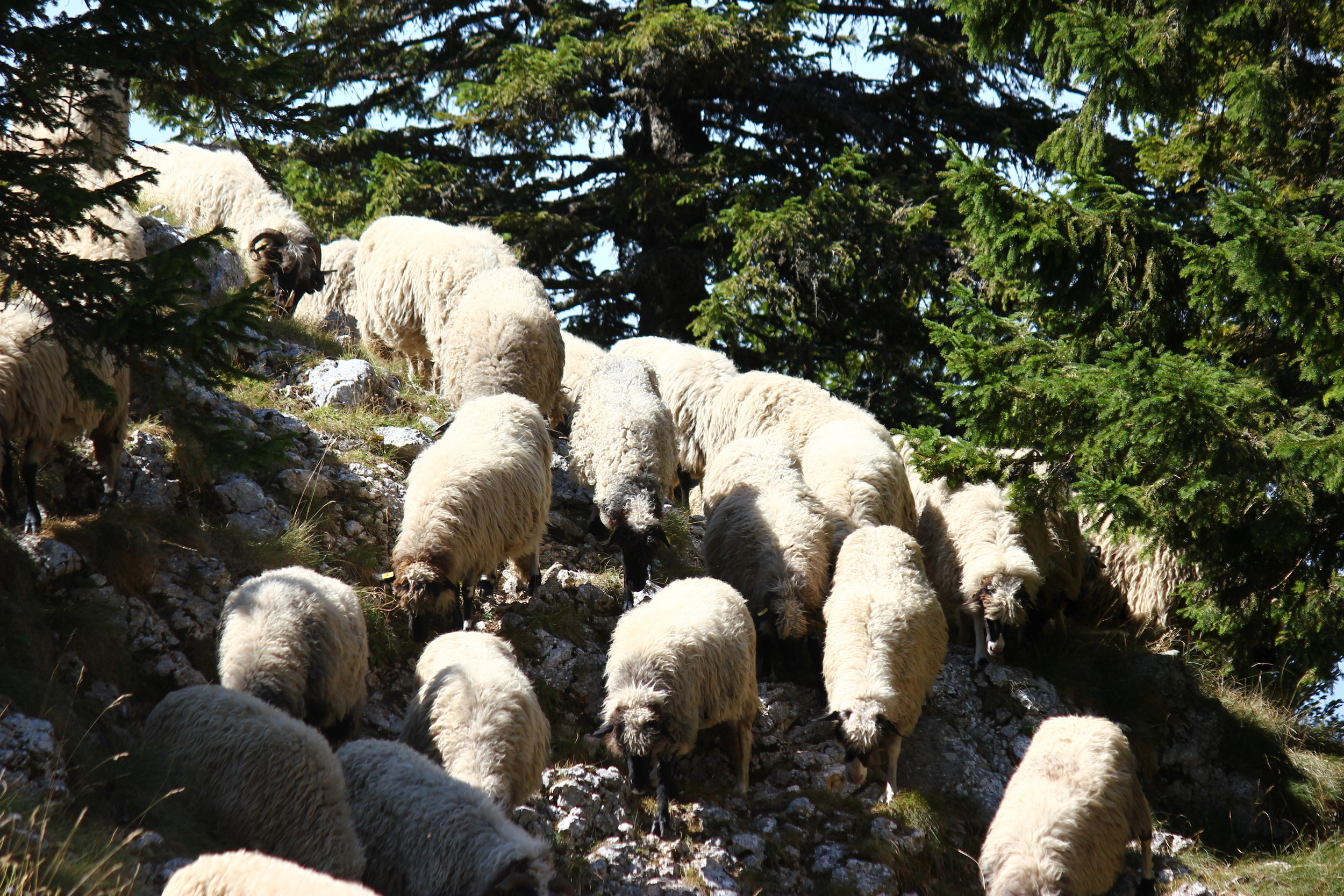
Sheep on Vlašić

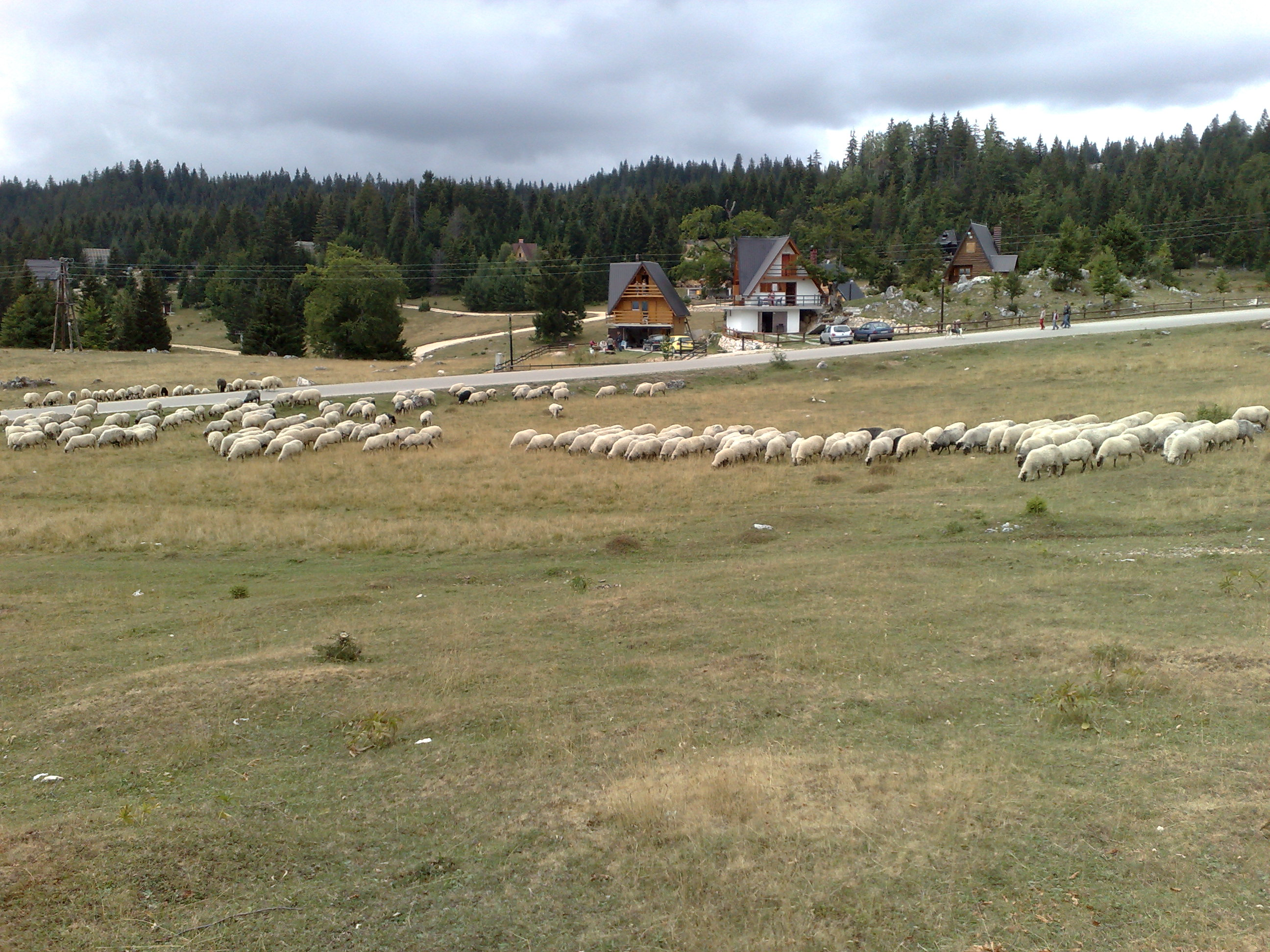
Sheep on Vlašić

== See also ==
- List of Bosnia and Herzegovina cheeses
