= Esrom =

Danish cheese

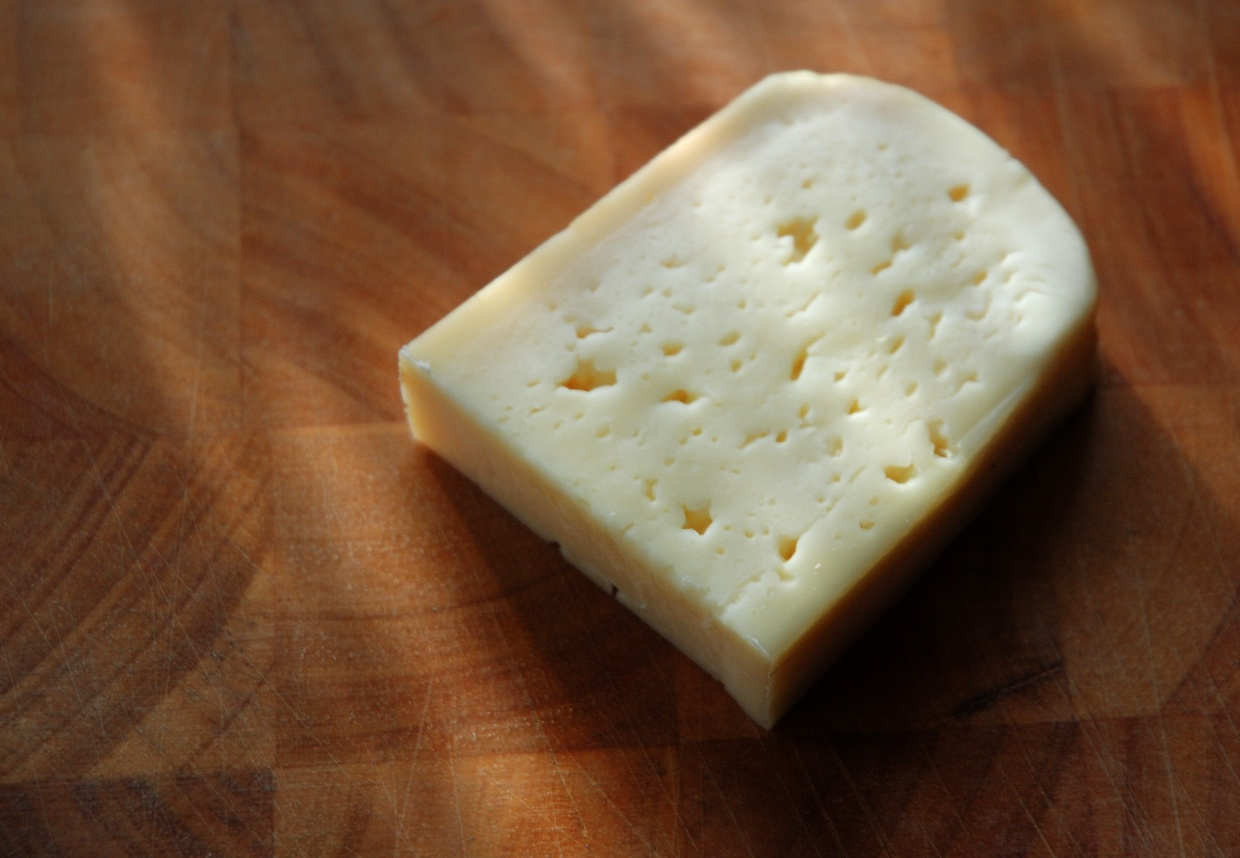
- Other names: Danish Port Salut
- Country of origin: Denmark
- Source of milk: cow
- Texture: semi-soft
- Certification: PGI
- Named after: Esrum Abbey

Esrom, or Danish Port Salut cheese is a Trappist-style pale yellow semi-soft cow's milk cheese with a pungent aroma and a full, sweet flavour.

== History ==
It takes its name from the monastery, Esrom Abbey, where it was produced until 1559. The production of modern-style Esrom cheese was standardized at Statens Forsøgsmejeri in the 1930s. The first large-scale production of the cheese was established at Midtsjællands Herregårdsmejeri in the early 1940s. It was one of the most popular Danish cheeses in the 1960s but then almost disappeared. Production of Esrom cheese has been revived by a number of dairy companies in more recent years.

== Character ==
Esrom is a porous cheese, with many small holes throughout, and is slightly elastic and buttery in texture. Commonly used as a table or melting cheese, it is also good in casseroles or sandwiches and is similar to havarti or Saint Paulin. Because of its bold flavour, it goes well with dark beers and red wines. It is slow ripened from a starting culture for a period of 10 to 12 weeks, then cured in rectangular moulds. It has a waxy yellow-brown rind.

== Status ==
Esrom, Danbo and Danablu are the only three Danish cheeses that are PGI-marked by the EU, meaning that they may only be produced in Denmark from Danish milk and at approved dairies that produce the cheeses according to the specifications laid down.

== See also ==
- List of cheeses
