= Livno cheese =

Bosnian cheese

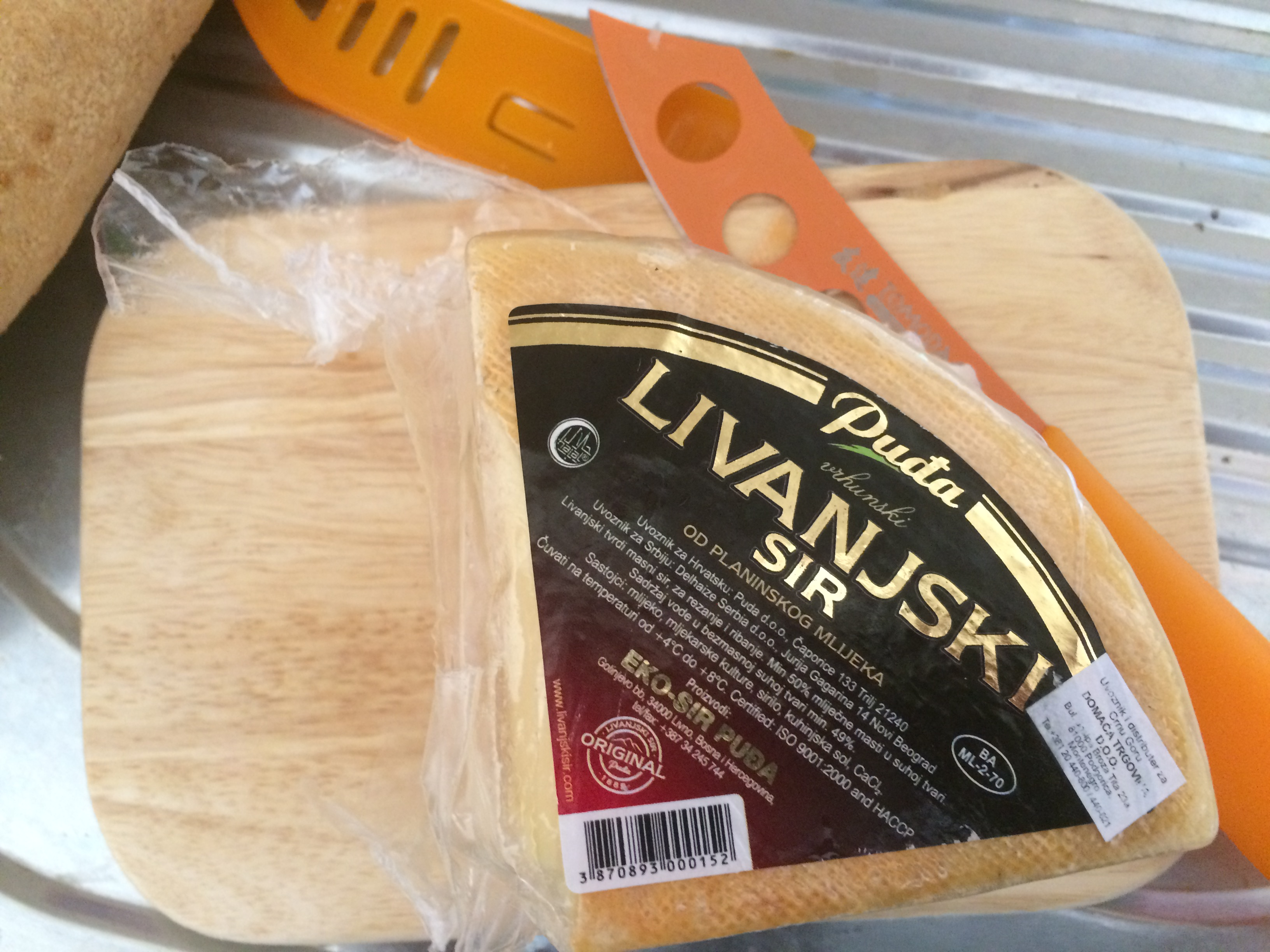
- Other names: Livanjski sir / Ливањски сир
- Country of origin: Bosnia and Herzegovina
- Region: Tropolje
- Town: Livno
- Source of milk: Cows
- Pasteurised: No
- Texture: Hard
- Aging time: 60–66 days

The Livno cheese (Bosnian: Livanjski sir/Ливањски сир) is a cheese first produced in the 19th century in the area of Livno, Bosnia and Herzegovina, where the cheese gets its name.

== History and description ==
Livno cheese is produced in Livno and in surrounding areas including Kupres, Glamoč and Tomislavgrad. Production started in 1886 when Austro-Hungarian administrators introduced method of the production based on French technology of making the Gruyère cheese, bringing Swiss cheese producers to train chosen local producers.

Originally, it was made from sheep's milk, nowadays, it is mainly made from a mixture of sheep's and cow's milk in 80:20 ration. Its maturation period is between 60 and 66 days in a controlled environment. The flavor is robust, and in cheeses that have aged longer, it has a slightly tangy taste. The largest producers are Mljekara Livno and Lura Dairy d.o.o. Livno, with a yearly production exceeding 500 metric tons.

=== Cincar ===
Cincar cheese is another traditional semi-hard to hard cheese from this region and is closely tied to the heritage and production of Livno cheese).

== See also ==
- List of Bosnia and Herzegovina cheeses
