= Port-du-Salut Abbey =

Abbey in Mayenne, France

Coordinates: 47°59.86′N -0°44.37′W

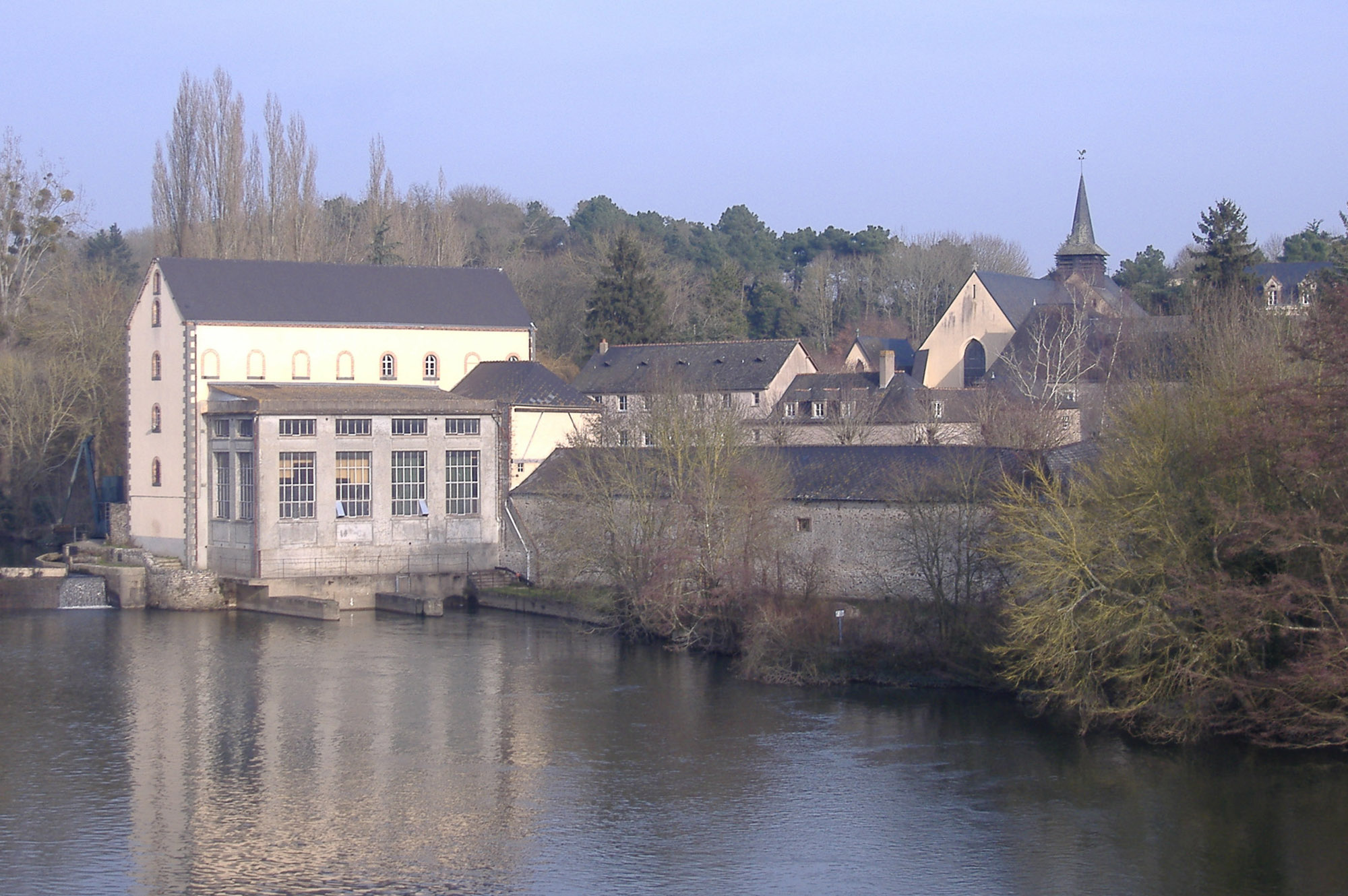
Port-du-Salut Abbey, seen from the Mayenne River

Port-du-Salut Abbey, also the Abbey of Notre-Dame du Port du Salut (French: Abbaye du Port-du-Salut, Abbaye Notre-Dame du Port-du-Salut or Abbaye du Port-Ringeard) is a Trappist monastery located in Entrammes, Mayenne, France. The main monastery building dates from around the 13th century.

== History ==
The Trappist abbey was founded in the early nineteenth century. In 1815, after twenty years of exile due to the suppression of religious orders by Napoleon, the Trappists returned to work in France. More precisely, on February 21, 1815, a Trappist community under Dom Bernard de Girmont, later their first abbot, settled in the empty buildings of a former priory occupied by a community of canons, dissolved during the French Revolution.

The new community was formally recognised as an abbey on December 10, 1816, by Pope Pius VII.

=== Present day ===
Today, in addition to the conventual buildings, the abbey church and the beautiful chapel of the Blessed Sacrament, the abbey has a house for pilgrims with about 30 rooms and a small shop at the entrance selling religious books and the produce of the monks: jam, honey, biscuits, cakes. There is also at the abbey entrance a small external house for pilgrims, in case of emergency arrivals at night.

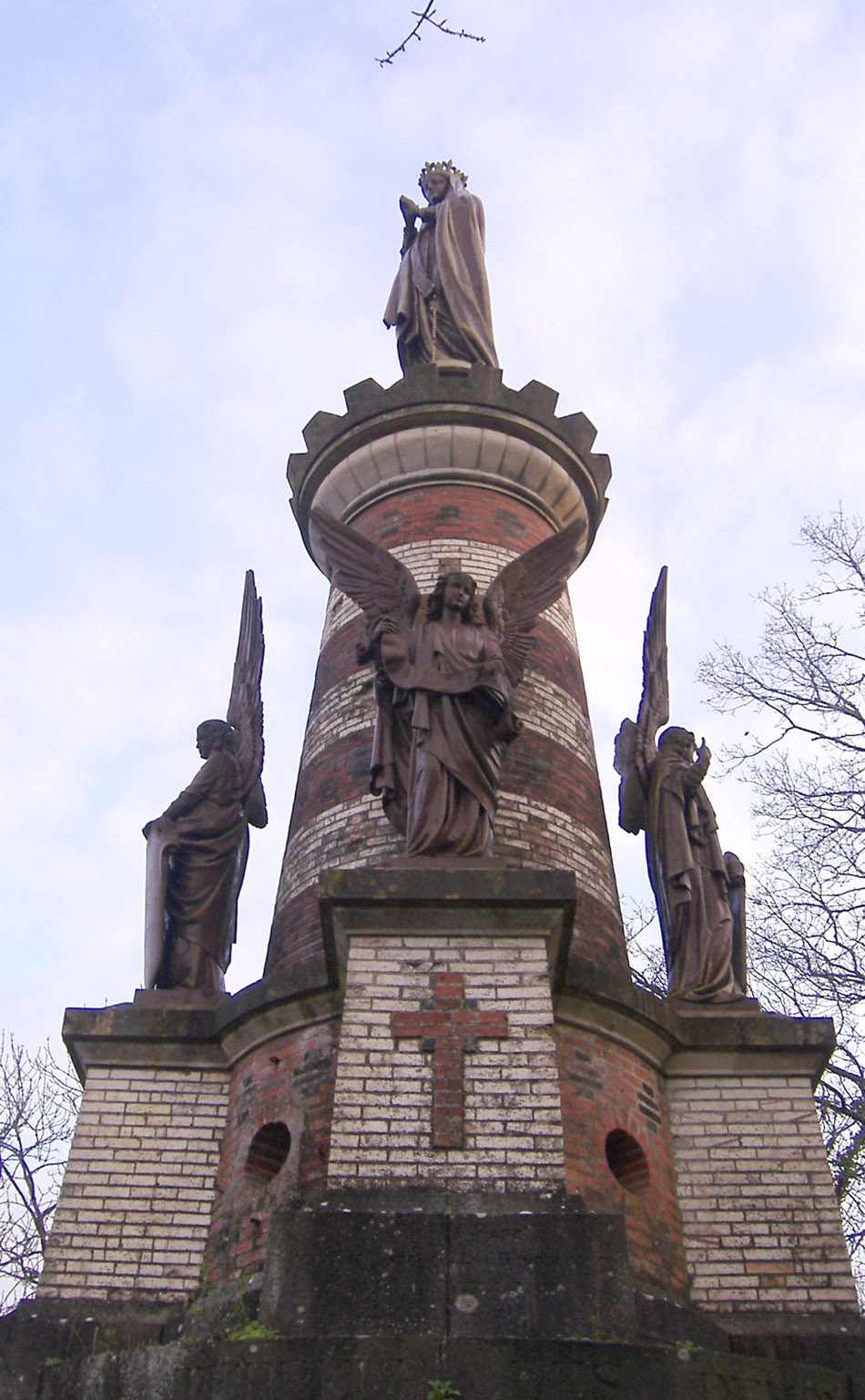
Column of Notre Dame du Triomphe

At the beginning of the 20th century at least 100 monks lived here, but today there are only 12.

=== Notre Dame du Triomphe ===
Behind the abbey is a little hill with a beautiful wild garden. A path leads to the column of Notre Dame du Triomphe (Our Lady of Triumph), a column on which there is a statue of the Virgin Mary overlooking the landscape. According to a plaque, all those who recite three Hail Marys are granted 100 days of indulgence, as determined by Pope Pius IX.

== Gallery ==
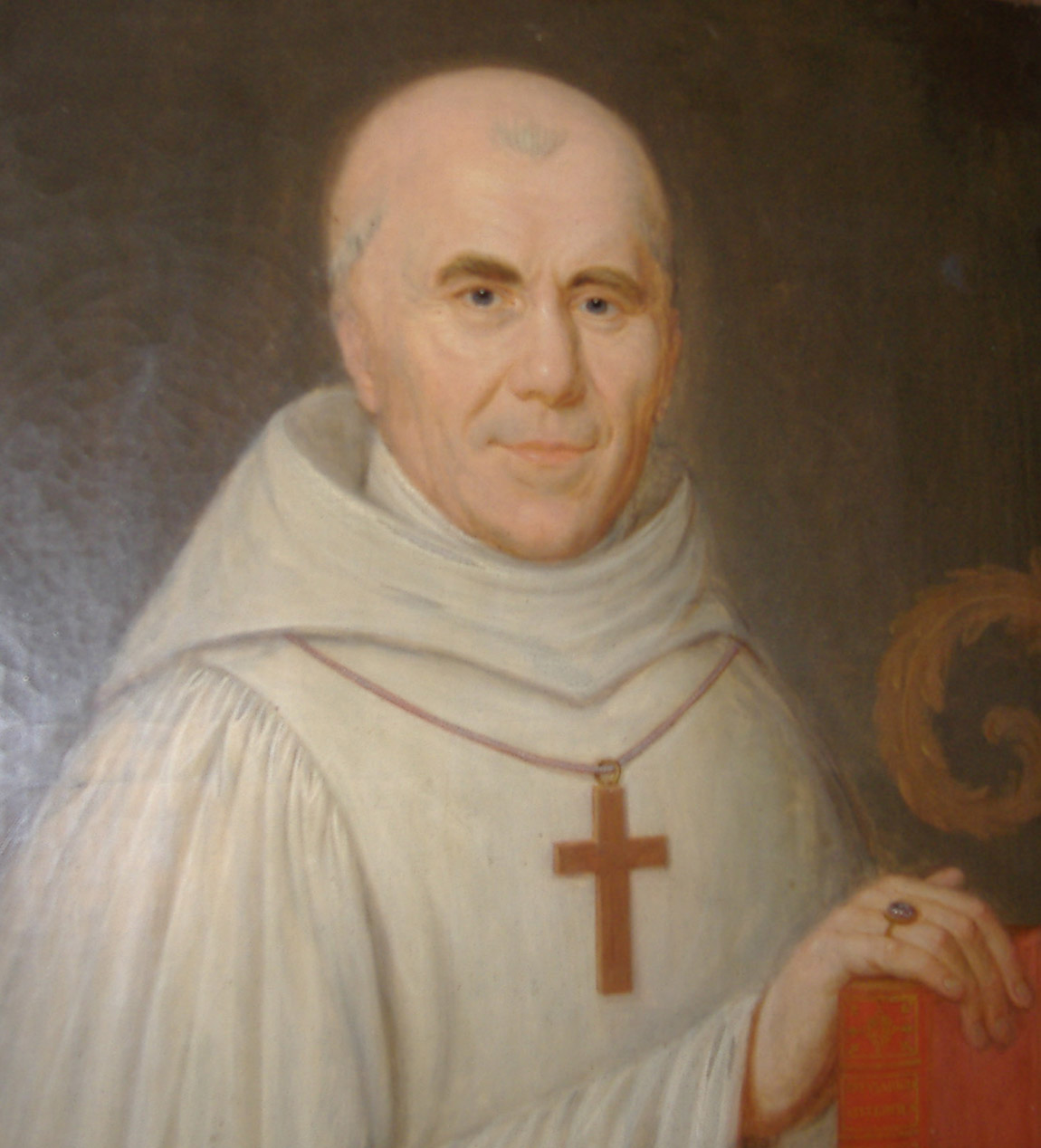
Dom Bernard de Girmont, first abbot, 1815.

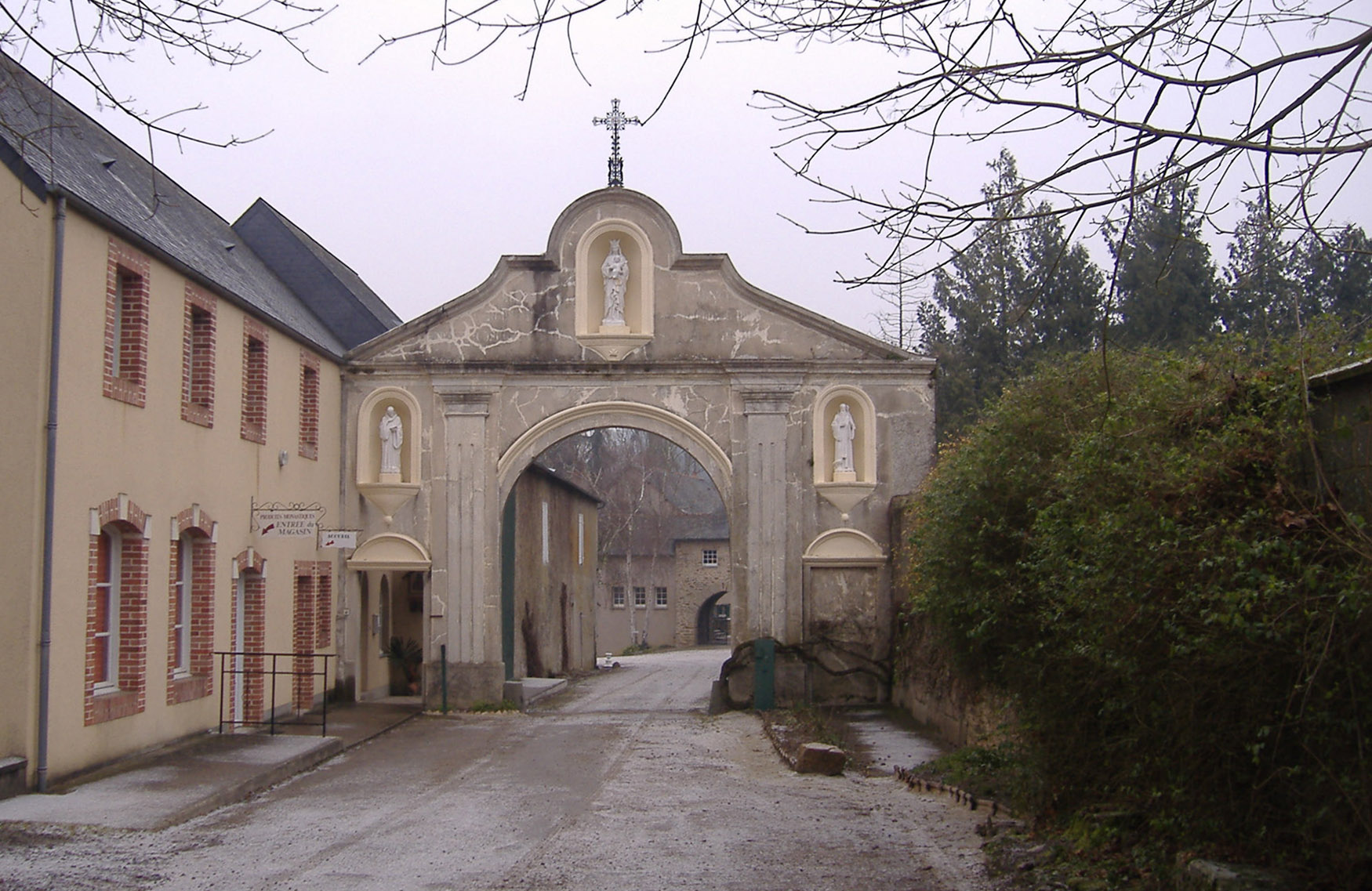
The entrance, with the little shop to the left.

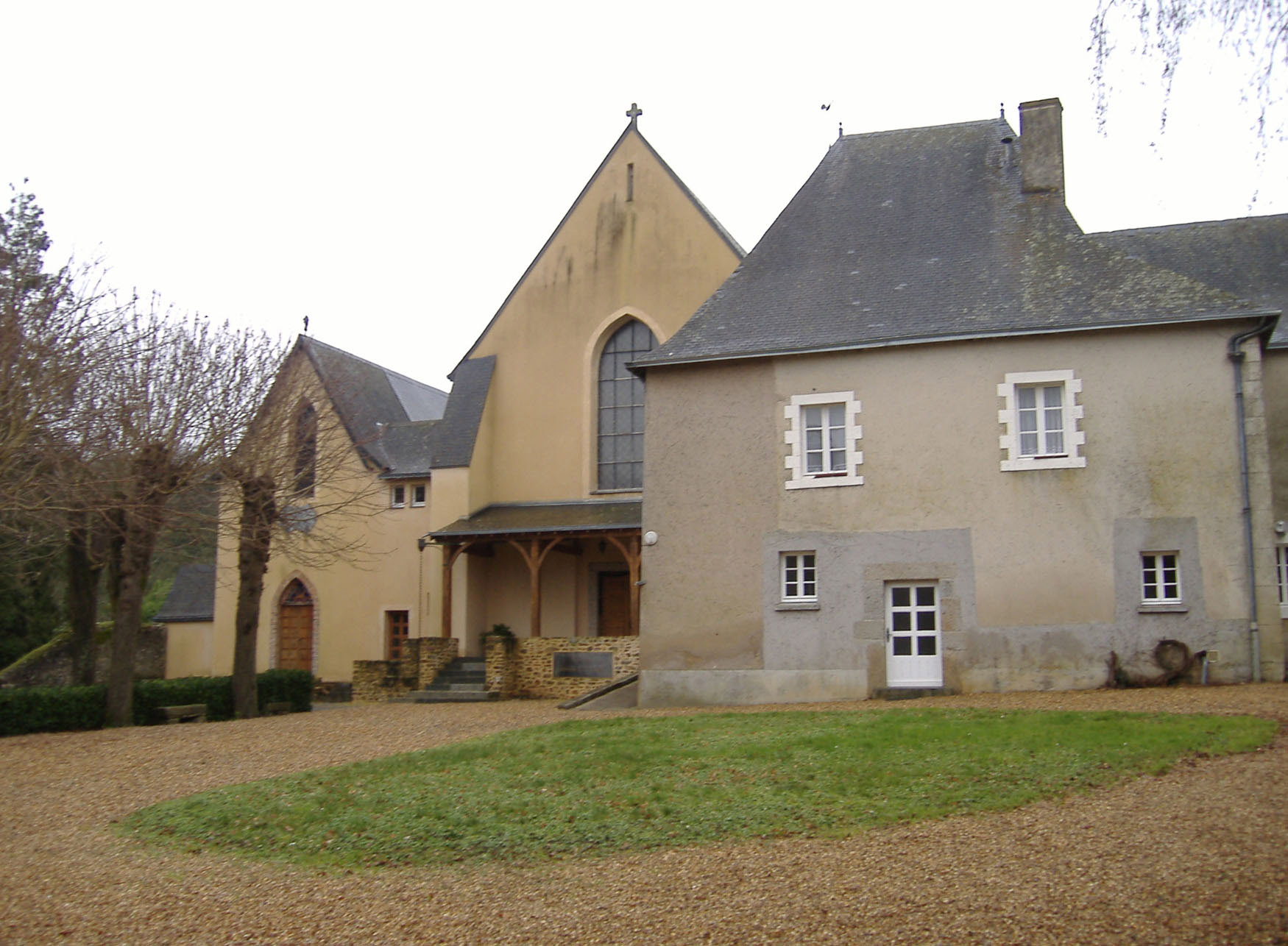
The abbey church

== See also ==
- Port Salut cheese, created by and named after this abbey
- Trappista cheese created by this abbey

== Bibliography ==
- Abbaye du Port-du-Salut, in Dictionnaire historique, topographique et biographique de la Mayenne by Alphonse-Victor Angot, Ferdinand Gaugain. Goupil, 1900–1910, vol. III, pp. 335–337; vol. IV, p. 748.
- Notre-dame-du-Triomphe. La Terreur des Démons. Historique de l'origine de la Construction et de la Bénédiction du Monument érigé dans l'Enclos de l'Abbaye du Port-du-Salut. Près Laval (Mayenne). Fare de Religiulo-Pastro de la Monahxejo. Laval, Impr. Eugène Jamin, 1875;
- Louis-Julien Morin de la Beauluère, Notice sur Entrammes;
- Charles Meignan, L'abbaye de la Trappe;
- Mémorial de la Mayenne, t. IV, p. 245;
- Revue du Maine, t. XLVIII, p. 124;
- Affiches, 1815;
- Annonces, November 1822;
- Vie du baron de Géramb, manuscript;
- La Mayenne, 1845;
- Écho, 1854;
- Indépendant, 1856;
- Ami de la Religion, 1812;
- E. Sauvage, Une visite à la Trappe;
- Guide pittoresque en France;
