= Abbey of Notre-Dame du Lac (Oka, Quebec) =

Coordinates: 45.4929°N 74.0296°W

The Abbey of Notre-Dame du Lac (fr. Abbaye Notre-Dame du Lac), known as the Oka Abbey (fr. Abbaye Cistercienne d'Oka), was a Trappist Cistercian monastery located in Oka, Quebec. The main monastery building is of grey stone; it has a dozen outbuildings, all of which are situated on a 270-hectare property. With a decline in the number of monks by the early 21st century, the monastery decided to end operations there and established a non-profit centre at the abbey to preserve the site's heritage.

== History ==
Following the seizure of the Cistercian Order's Abbaye de Bellefontaine in Bégrolles-en-Mauges, Maine-et-Loire, France by the army of the French Third Republic in November 1880, the Trappists living at the Abbaye were expelled from the country. After receiving an invitation by Father Victor Rousselot of the Grand Seminary of the Sulpician Order in Montreal, Quebec, Canada, eight Trappist monks emigrated to Quebec in April 1881 to establish a new foundation.

From their vast Quebec holdings, the Sulpician Order offered the Trappists a parcel of land at their property on the Lac des Deux Montagnes (Lake of Two Mountains) at Oka, Quebec. (Situated northwest of Montreal in the region of Deux-Montagnes). Naming the property La Trappe after Soligny-la-Trappe in France where the Order had been founded in 1662, the monks established the monastery. Within a few years, through an affiliation with the Université de Montréal, the monastery created an agricultural school under the name of Oka Agricultural Institute. Along with this agricultural school, the Abbey supported itself by producing cheeses such as Oka and Port-Salut.

At its peak, the monastery housed upwards of 200 monks. By the early 21st century, as the number of religious vocations declined, 28 brothers remained and half were older than 70. The monks ended the operation of the monastery, donating the property to establish a non-profit centre to preserve the site's heritage.

The Trappists have built a new, smaller monastery. They have changed their name to Abbaye Val Notre-Dame.
