= Bosnian smoked cheese =

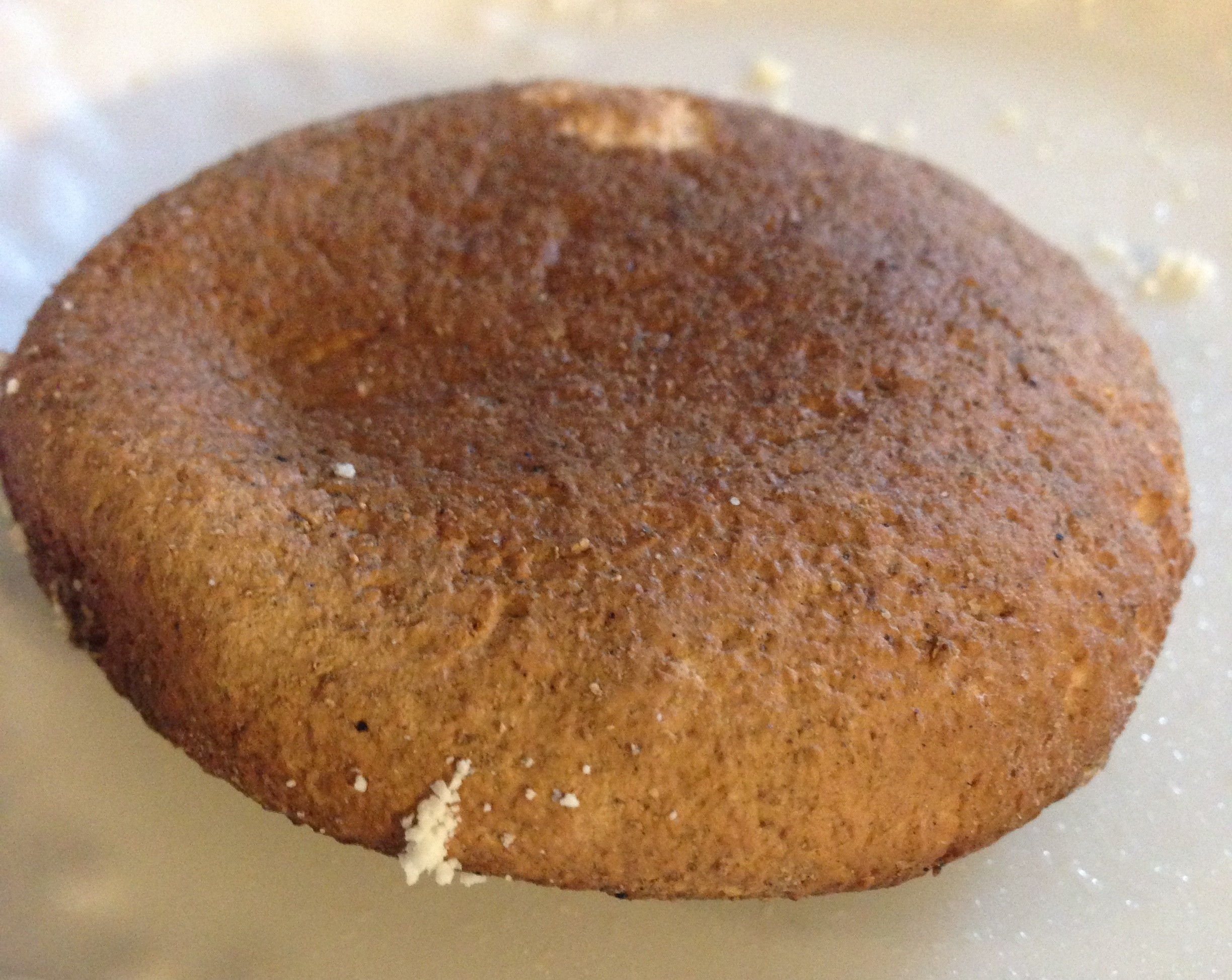
- Other names: Suhi dimljeni sir
- Country of origin: Bosnia and Herzegovina
- Region: Central to north-eastern Bosnia
- Town: Vareš, Olovo, Tuzla
- Source of milk: Sheep's, goat's, cow's and mixtures
- Pasteurised: No
- Texture: dark-skin, white, hard
- Fat content: low
- Dimensions: small, round

Bosnian smoked cheese (Bosnian: Suhi dimljeni sir or Dimljeni sir) is a type of very dry piquant low-fat smoked cheese originating from Bosnia and Herzegovina. It is usually home-made product, but industrial production also exists.

== History ==
Northern Bosnia and Herzegovina has a rich agricultural history. Farmers in the region became skilled in the techniques of smoking and salting as methods of meat preservation prior to the introduction of commercial refrigeration, and used these methods to develop local meat dishes such as suho meso. Smoking was also adopted in the production of dairy products, including cheese. Similar smoked cheeses are also found in other countries in the Balkans, including Croatia and Serbia.

== Popularity and consumption ==
Bosnian smoked cheese is usually consumed as a supplement to the main and side dishes, or as a substitute for other cheese variations.

== Also see ==
- List of Bosnia and Herzegovina cheeses
