= List of Bosnia and Herzegovina cheeses =

Location of cheese producers in Bosnia and Herzegovina and milk industry sites (blue dots indicate traditional and small cheese manufactures).

Traditionally, many distinct types of cheeses have originated from Bosnia and Herzegovina, with as many varieties within each type.

== Protected designation of origin ==
Under the Common Agricultural Policy of the European Union, certain established cheeses are covered by a protected designation of origin (PDO), and other, less stringent, designations of geographical origin for traditional specialities, such as the French appellation d'origine contrôlée (AOC) system, the Italian denominazione di origine controllata (DOC) system, and the Spanish Denominación de origen system.

In Bosnia and Herzegovina the process of protection according to national categorization is currently in progress. For that purpose, among other, the Association of Cheese Producers in Bosnia and Herzegovina (AoCP BiH) was established in 2012, in coordination with Farma BiH, and it gathers cheese producers from all BiH. The members of this state – level association are processing companies, agricultural cooperatives, individual producers and smaller regional associations. Important regional and local subsidiaries are Association of producers of the traditional Livno cheese "Cincar" and "Cincar 2" Agricultural Cooperative. Another organization managing quality and originality control is established, Center for Sack Cheese Maturation (Serbo-Croatian: Centar za zrenje sira iz mijeha), concerned with this particular variety production.

Cheese	Type of milk	Image	Producing region	AoCP BiH recognized; year	Note
Bosnian Gruyère cheese	Cow's milk			Yes;	
Bosnian smoked cheese	Sheep's, cow's, goat's milk and/or mixtures				
Cincar cheese	Cow's milk		Cincar, Livno	Yes;	
Herzegovina sack cheese	Skimmed and/or whole sheep's, goat's, cow's milk and/or mixtures		Nevesinje	Yes;	
Herzegovina "squeaking" cheese	Raw sheep's or cow's milk		Trebinje, Ivanica, Slavogostići, Gacko in southern Herzegovina	Yes;	Squeaking cheese from Lika in Croatia is often smoked.
Kupres cheese	Sheep's and cow's milk mixtures		Kupres	Yes;	
Livno cheese	Sheep's and cow's milk in 80:20 ratio		Livanjsko polje, Livno	Yes;	
Mladi sir	Raw cow's milk				
Mons goat cheese			Tešanj	Yes;	
Trappista cheese	Cow's milk		Mariastern abbey, Banja Luka	Yes;	
Vlašić cheese	Sheep's, cow's and mixtures		Vlašić, Travnik	Yes;	
Zlatna kap / Tešanj cheese			Tešanj	Yes;	
Zlatni sir (transl. Golden cheese)			Foča	Yes;	

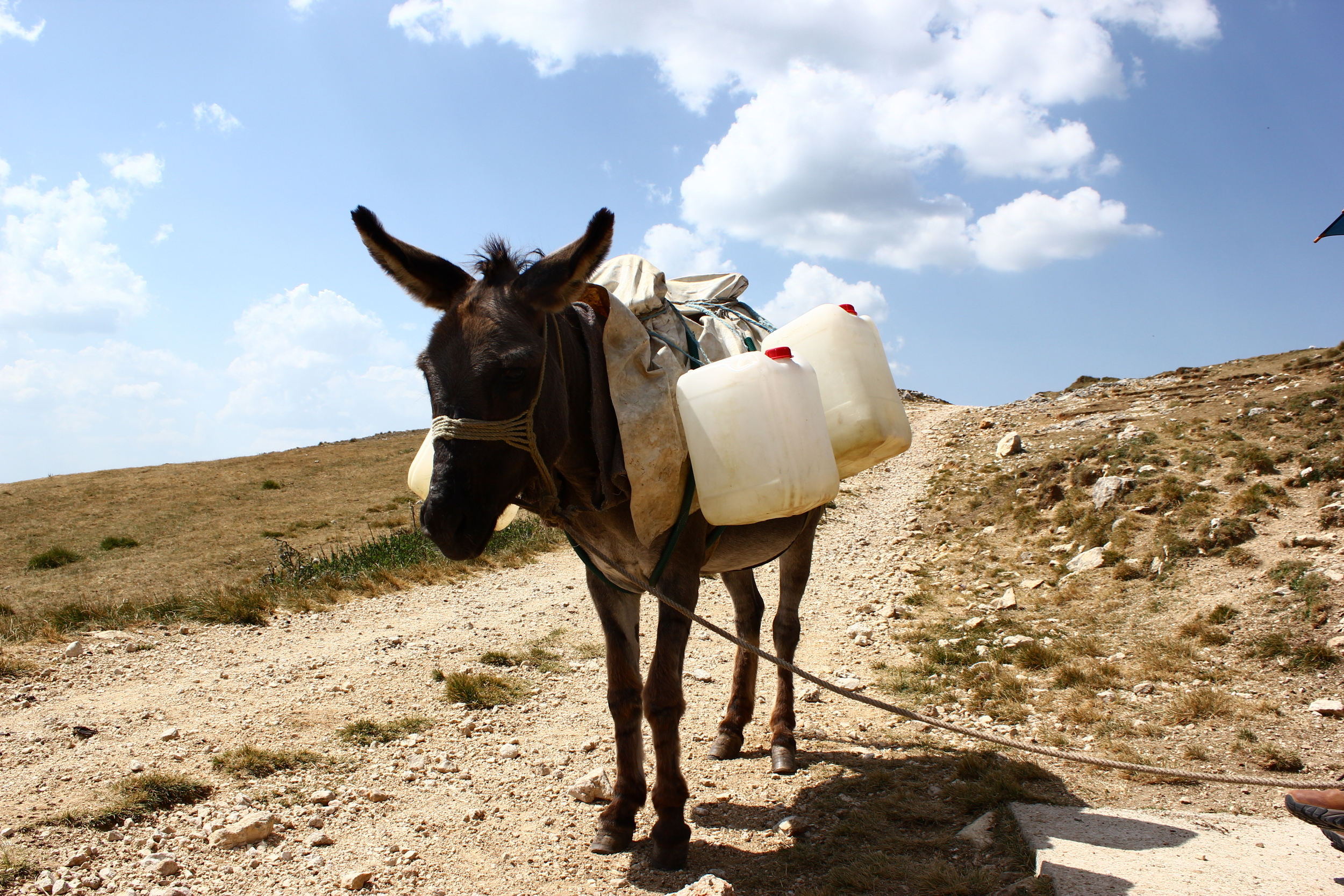
Donkey on Vlašić mountain, carries canisters of sheep's milk.

== Other cheeses and dairy's products ==
- Sheepskin sack kajmak
- Kajmak

== See also ==
- Bosnia and Herzegovina cuisine
- List of cheeses
- List of cheesemakers
