= Saint-Paulin cheese =

Type of cheese

Saint Paulin
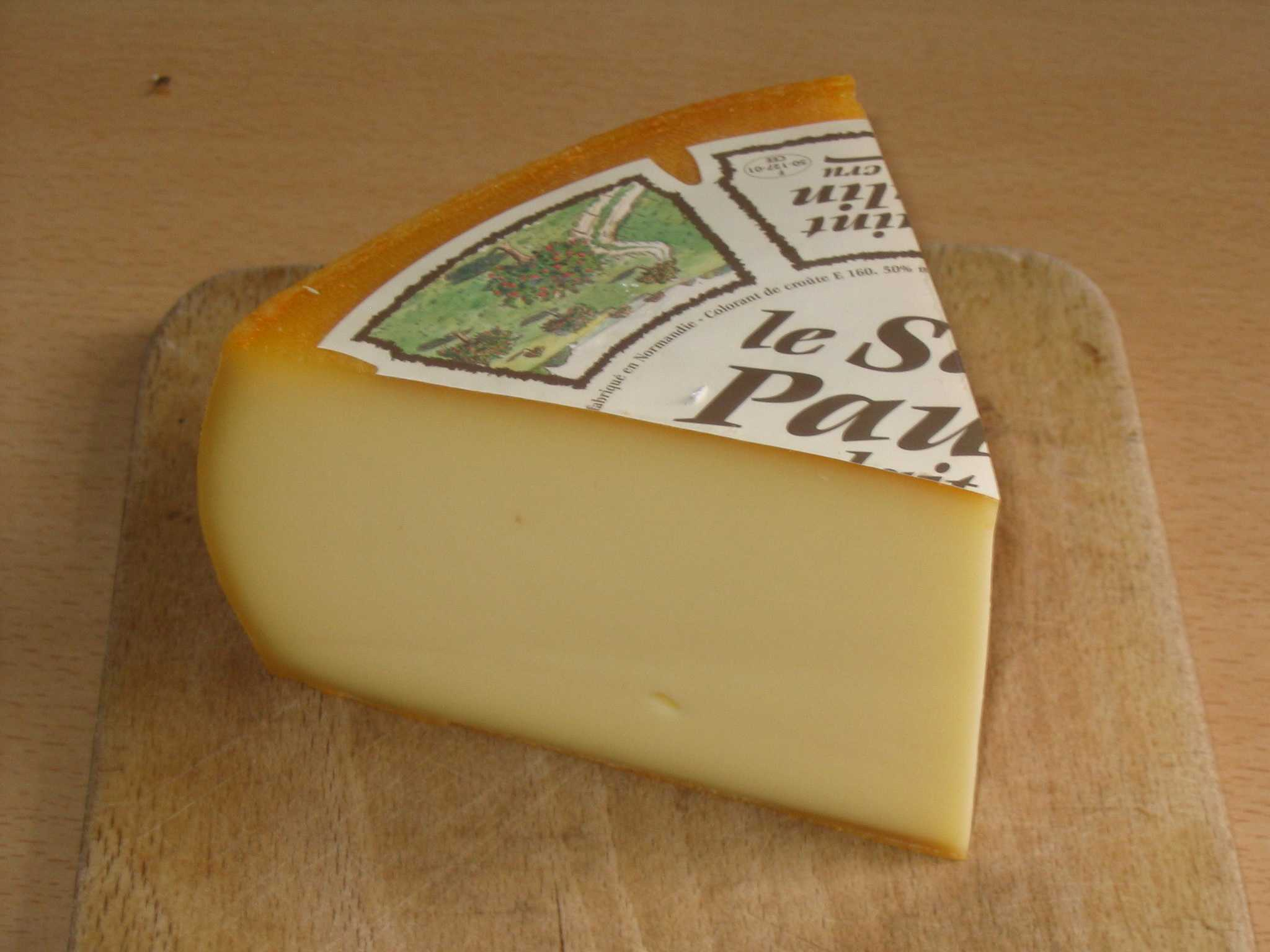
- Country of origin: France
- Source of milk: Cows
- Pasteurized: Yes
- Texture: Soft pressed cheese
- Aging time: 4-5 weeks

Saint Paulin (French pronunciation: [sɛ̃ polɛ̃]) is a creamy, mild, semi-soft French cheese made from pasteurized cow's milk, originally made by Trappist monks at Saint Paulin. It is a buttery cheese, but firm enough for slicing. Saint Paulin is similar to Havarti and Esrom, and is suited to serving as a table or dessert cheese; it is often served with fruit and light wine. Genuine Saint Paulin has an edible yellow-orange rind. It is ripened in a round loaf with slightly protruding sides, and matures in about four weeks.

A cousin to Port Salut, this cheese is made with pasteurised milk and has a washed rind. Curdled, stirred, drained, and bathed in brine, the crust has a touch of annatto to give it a distinctive orange tint. Saint Paulin spends three weeks in a ripening chamber. It is a subtle cheese, with a hint of sweetness and a taste of slightly acidulated fresh milk.

== See also ==
- Port Salut, another Trappist cheese from France
