= Port Salut =

Variety of French semi-soft cheese

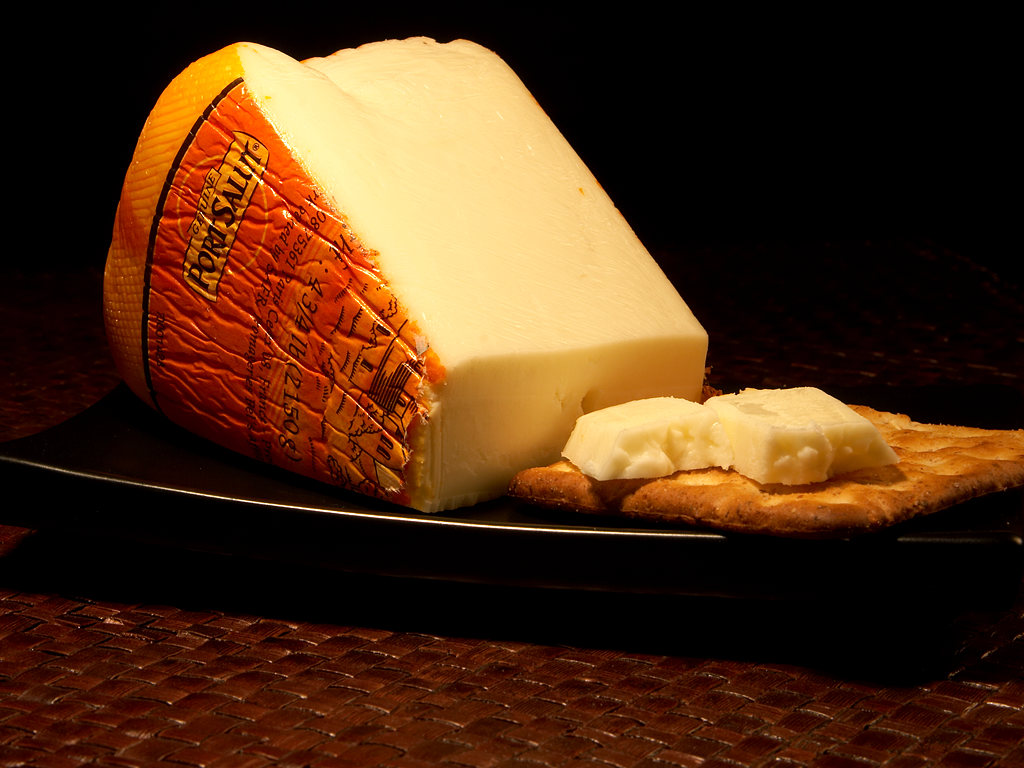
- Port Salut cheese
- Country of origin: France
- Region, town: Pays de la Loire (Mayenne)
- Source of milk: Cow
- Pasteurised: Yes
- Texture: Semi-soft

Port Salut (French pronunciation: [pɔʁ saly]) is a semi-soft pasteurised cow's milk cheese from Pays de la Loire, France, with a distinctive orange rind and a mild flavour. The cheese is produced in wheels approximately 23 cm (9 inches) in diameter, weighing approximately 2 kg (4.4 lb).

Though Port Salut has a mild flavour, it sometimes has a strong smell because it is a mature cheese. The smell increases the longer the cheese is kept; this does not affect its flavour. It can be refrigerated and is best eaten within two weeks of opening.

The cheese was developed by Trappist monks during the 19th century at Port-du-Salut Abbey in Entrammes. The monks, many of whom had left France during the French Revolution of 1789, learned cheese-making skills to support themselves abroad, and brought those skills back upon their return after the Bourbon Restoration. The name of their society, "Société Anonyme des Fermiers Réunis" (S.A.F.R.), later became their registered trademark, and is still printed on the wheels of Port Salut cheese.

In 1873, the head of the abbey came to an agreement with a Parisian cheese-seller granting exclusive rights of distribution, and purchases of the cheese soon began to increase. The abbey sought trade protection, and eventually, sold the rights to the Bel Group in 1950. The cheese is now produced in a factory, with the characteristic smooth rind now the result of a plastic-coated wrapper. When made of wax the rind may be edible, but can detract from the flavour of the cheese.

Handmade Port Salut cheese or "Entrammes" cheese is still produced by various monasteries throughout the French countryside.

== See also ==
- Port wine cheese
- List of cheeses
- List of French cheeses
- Trappista cheese
