= Canadienne cattle =

Canadian breed of cattle

Canadienne
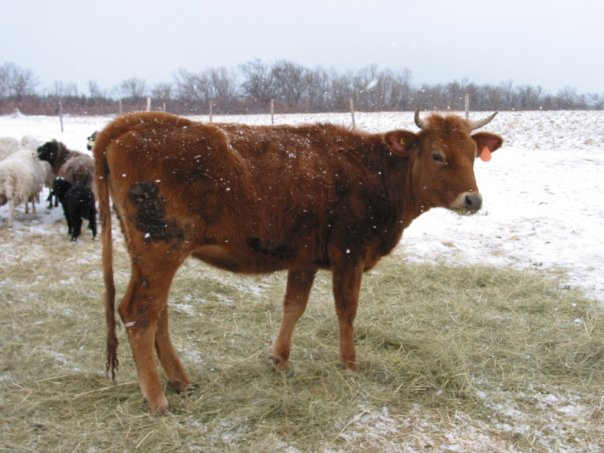
- A heifer

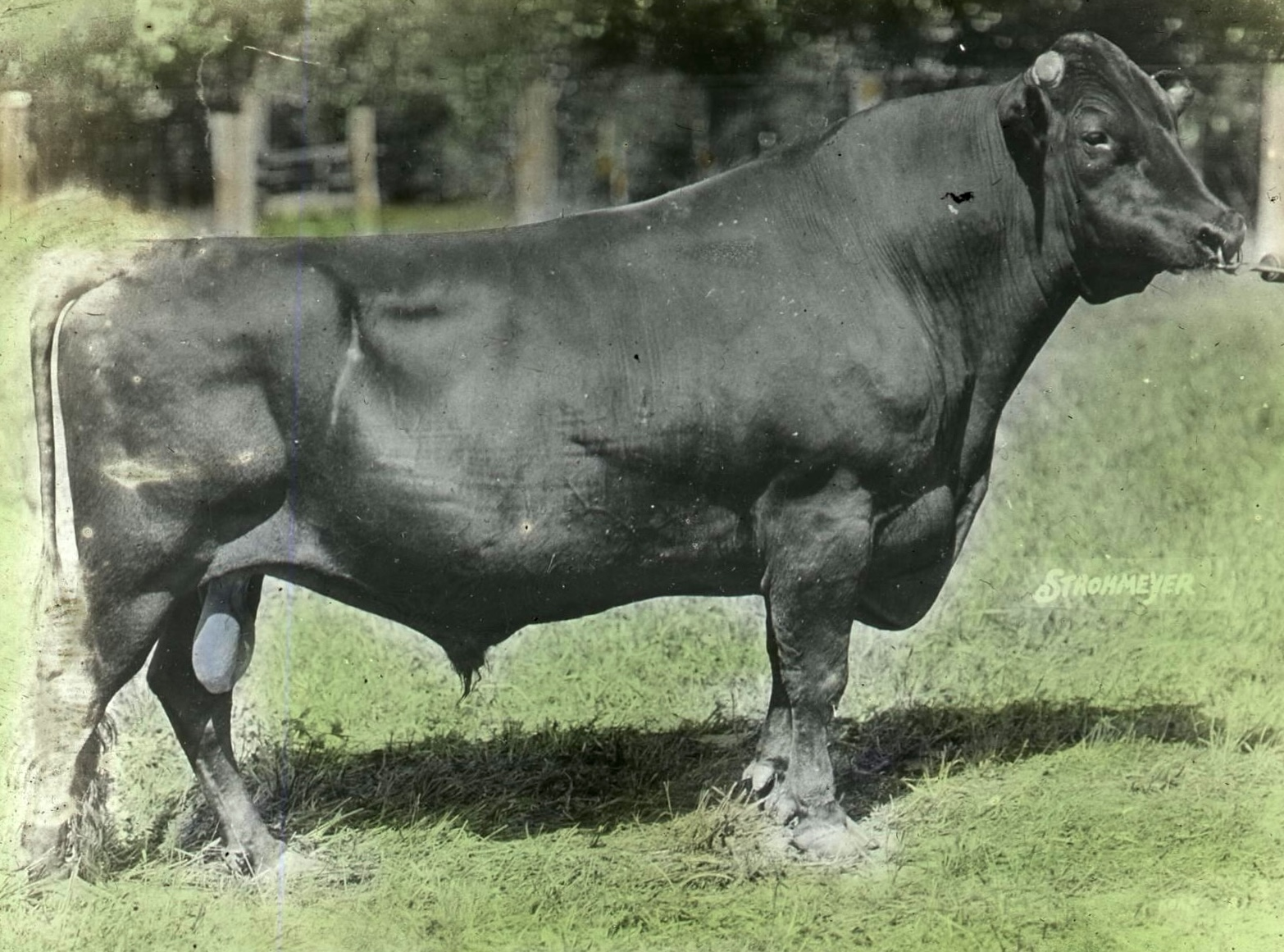
- A bull, image from the 1920s
- Conservation status: FAO (2007): endangered–maintained; DAD-IS (2025): at risk/endangered
- Other names: Black Jersey
- Country of origin: Canada
- Distribution: principally Quebec
- Use: dairy

Traits
- Weight: Male: 750 kg; Female: 475 kg
- Skin colour: black

The Canadienne, also known as Black Canadienne, French Canadienne or Black Jersey, is a Canadian breed of dairy cattle. It is the only cattle breed originating in Canada. It derives from cattle brought by French settlers to New France in the seventeenth century, and was the most common breed of domestic cattle in Canada until the late nineteenth century, when other breeds such as the Hereford and Holstein began to displace it. It is still found on some farms and ranches, but is comparatively rare except in certain areas of the province of Quebec. Efforts by an active breed society and the Quebec government have been made in recent years to preserve the breed from extinction.

== History ==
The Canadienne breed can be traced back to cattle in present-day Quebec that came from the Normandy and Brittany regions of France in the 1600s. The breeds that came in are unknown; the melting-pot effect took over until the breed took on its own appearance and type. It is commonly asserted that the Canadienne derives from the same general ancestry as the Guernsey, Jersey and Kerry breeds of the Channel Islands and Ireland; this is not supported by mitochondrial D-loop data, which suggest a closer connection to the Brown Swiss. They developed into a hardy, compact dairy breed that could survive the harsh environment of Quebec. The cattle also provided draught work and meat, which was important to the colonists.

In 1850, the Canadian Parliament discovered that the vast majority of cattle in Quebec were Canadienne, so they began to discourage its breeding and soon the breed received competition from other breeds.

A breed society, the Société des Éleveurs de Bovins Canadiens was formed in 1895; in 2000 it had 82 members and during the course of the year registered 103 pure-bred and 105 other cattle. A herd-book was established in either 1886 or 1896. The breed later gained recognition in 1901 for being the most profitable dairy breed in the Pan-American show in Buffalo, New York.

In the early 1970s, the Ministry of Agriculture became concerned about in-breeding and the lack of improvement in milk production, so they introduced Brown Swiss blood. This was uncontrolled and was stopped to preserve the identity of the Canadienne. In 1999, the Canadienne was given official heritage status by the Government of Quebec and its breeding program is supported to preserve the breed.

The conservation status of the Canadienne was listed by the Food and Agriculture Organization of the United Nations in 2007 as "endangered–maintained". In 2025 it was listed in DAD-IS as "at risk/endangered".

== Characteristics ==
The cattle are small- to medium-sized; cows weigh between 400 and 500 kg and bulls average 800 kg. This breed has been developed to survive in the harsh Canadian environment. Their small size allows the animals to remain longer at pasture in early spring and late fall because they cause less damage to the soil than do heavier breeds. The horns – if present – are long and upturned, with dark-coloured tips.

Most cattle have black, brown or russet coats with a lighter coloured topline, udder and muzzle; shades varying between black and brown comprise the colouring for other parts of their bodies. When calves are first born they have light coat colours, and following 4 months of age coat colouration, the colour becomes permanently established.

== Use ==
The main use of the cattle is for milk production. They are efficient milk producers; the milk contains high levels of butterfat and protein, making it suitable for cheese production. They have been raised for beef; the meat tends to be lean.
