= Maître de Chaource =

French sculptor

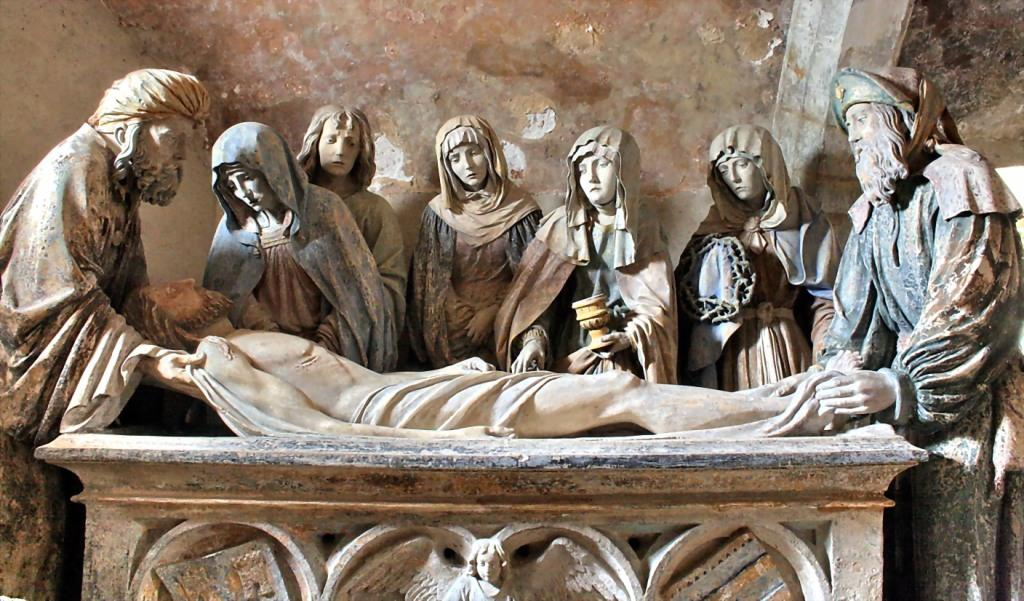
The mise au tombeau in the parish church of Saint-Jean-Baptiste in Chaource. Photograph shown courtesy Jean-Marie Kinet. Figures from left to right, Nicodemus, the Virgin Mary, Saint John, Mary Salome, Mary Magdalene with a pot of ointment, Mary of Clopas with the crown of thorns and Joseph of Arimathea.

The Maître de Chaource was an unidentified sculptor who worked in the late 15th and early 16th century, in the French town of Chaource. While many works are attributed anonymously to him or his atelier, some scholars have identified Jacques Bachot as the artist. There is certainly circumstantial evidence which points to Bachot; he was a contemporary of the Maître de Chaource and often worked in the same locations and works by Bachot such as that in the church of Saint-Laurent in Joinville, of which fragments are held in the Joinville Town Hall, show great similarities to the work of the Maître de Chaource.

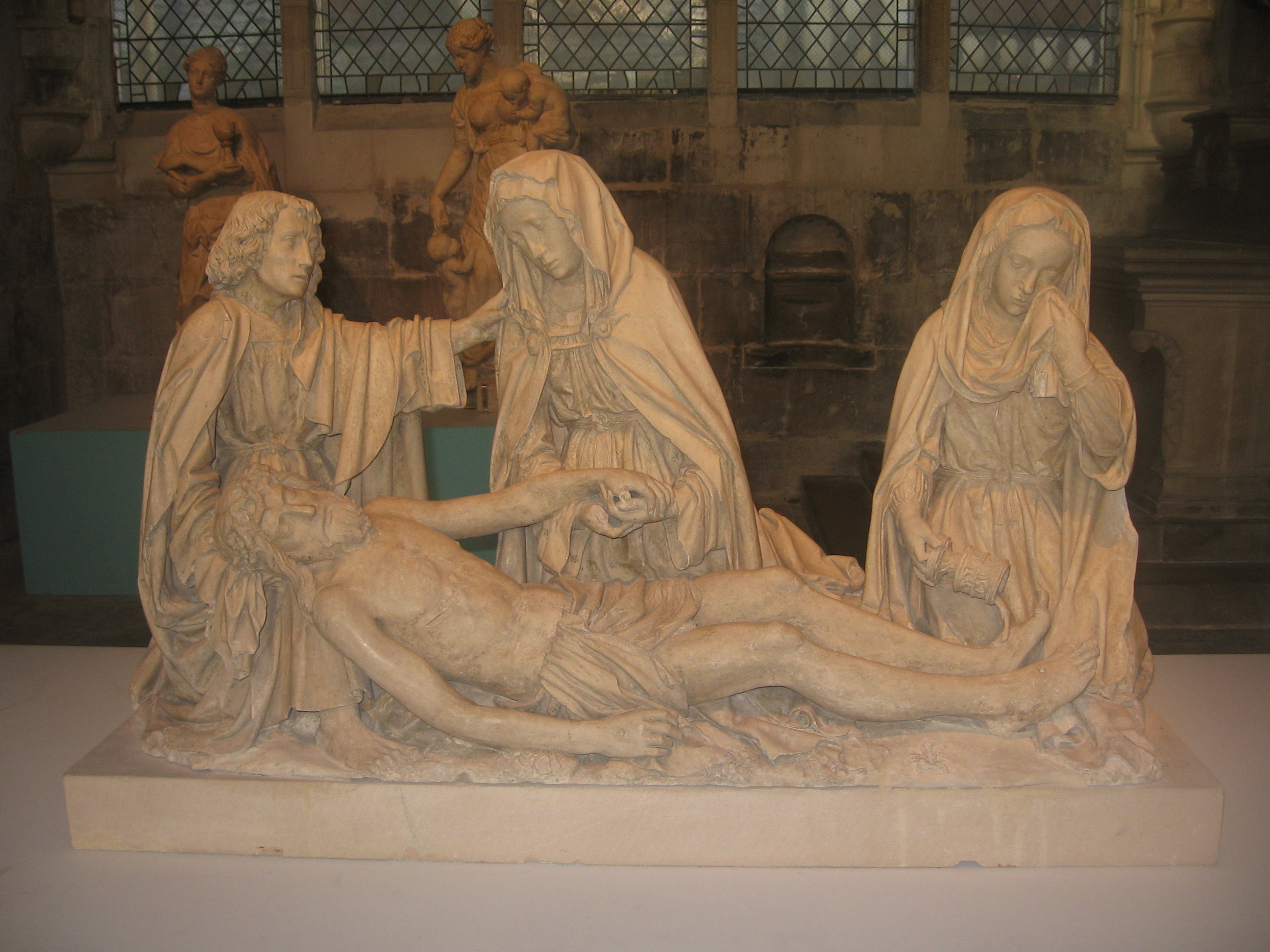
The Lamentation or "Déploration" in the Église Saint-Jean au Marché in Troyes

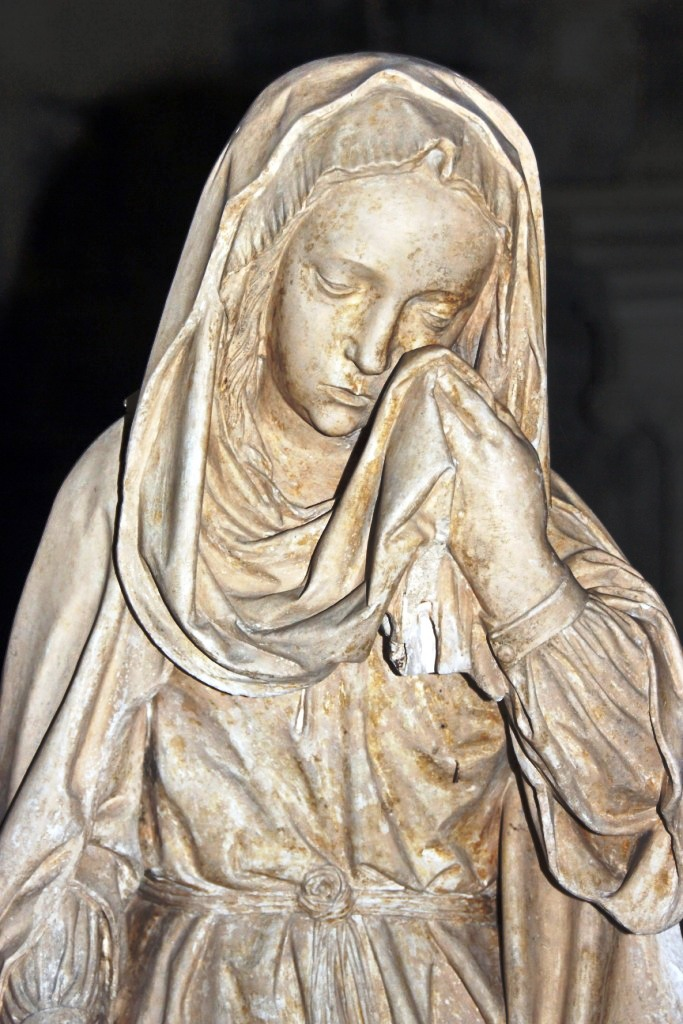
Mary Magdalene wipes away a tear. Part of the "Lamentation" in the Église Saint-Jean au Marché in Troyes. Photograph shown courtesy of Jean-Marie Kinet

In 1992, Heinz-Herman Arnhold wrote that the works of the Maître de Chaource's atelier can be seen from Reims in the north to Ravières in the south and from Langres in the east to Villeneuve-l'Archevêque in the west.

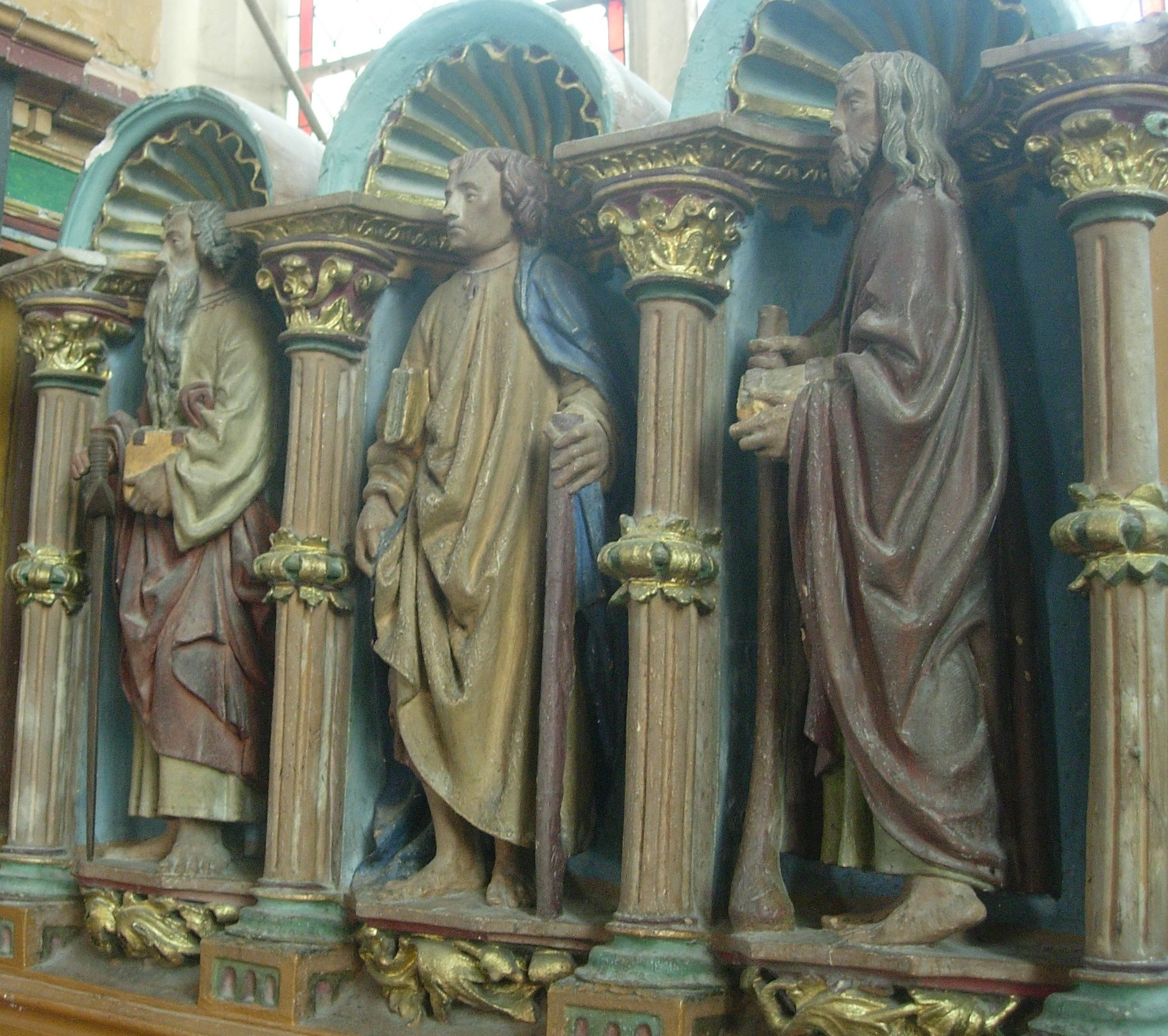
Detail of the altarpiece at Marigny-le-Châtel

== Context and career ==
Arnhold's thesis covers that sculpture of Troyes and southern Champagne created between 1480 and 1540 by regional masters, and he states that no other region in France in the time from the late 15th century to the middle of the 16th century has had a richer production of sculptures. Sculpture in southern Champagne flourished at a time when the arts in the neighbouring regions of Lorraine, Burgundy and the Île-de-France had already passed their peak and Arnhold concludes that the reasons for this can be found in the economic prosperity of Troyes, the old capital city of the counts of Champagne. This prosperity was based partly on Troyes' geographic position, being a transit point both of the trade routes between Northern France and the Netherlands and Southern France and Italy and also on the making and selling of fine cloth throughout Europe. It was the church and the monasteries, the nobility, corporations and rich merchant families who undertook most of the commissions, competing by their orders for the religious and artistic improvement of the churches and noble town-palaces, mostly situated in and near Troyes.

Arnhold writes that the region's sculptors and their workshops, as was the case with painters, created, developed and maintained a regional and iconographical style which persisted until around 1540 and concentrated very much on themes linked to the Passion of Christ such as the "Pietà" or "Vierge de pitié" and "Christ de Pitié". The sculptures of 'Ecce Homo', the Entombment of Christ, the Descent from the Cross, but also the Virgin and Child, the Education of Mary as well as different Saints which were venerated in Champagne, are the most important and numerously represented subjects. The mood of the Passion is expressed in studies of suffering and sorrow all portrayed with an inordinate feeling of resignation.

The Master of Chaource, so named because of his magisterial "Entombment" in Chaource of 1515, is the region's most important sculptor with a characteristic style which Arnhold explores in the first part of this work. He also catalogues 329 works with nearly 400 illustrations thus providing an invaluable resource for those studying the region's 16th century sculpture and he not only makes attributions where possible to the Maître de Chaource but also explores the extent to which the Maître's style influenced other workshops in the region, such the workshop of Saint-Léger, that of the Master of Rigny-le-Ferron and the workshop of Vendeuvre-sur-Barse.

Arnhold discusses the work of Nicolas Halins for the western facade of Troyes cathedral, and hypothesizes about whether Halins could have been the Maître de Chaource.

Arnhold also links the two statues of Saint John in the "Chapelle des Annonciades" in Langres with the Maître de Chaource.

== The Chaource mise au tombeau or entombment ==
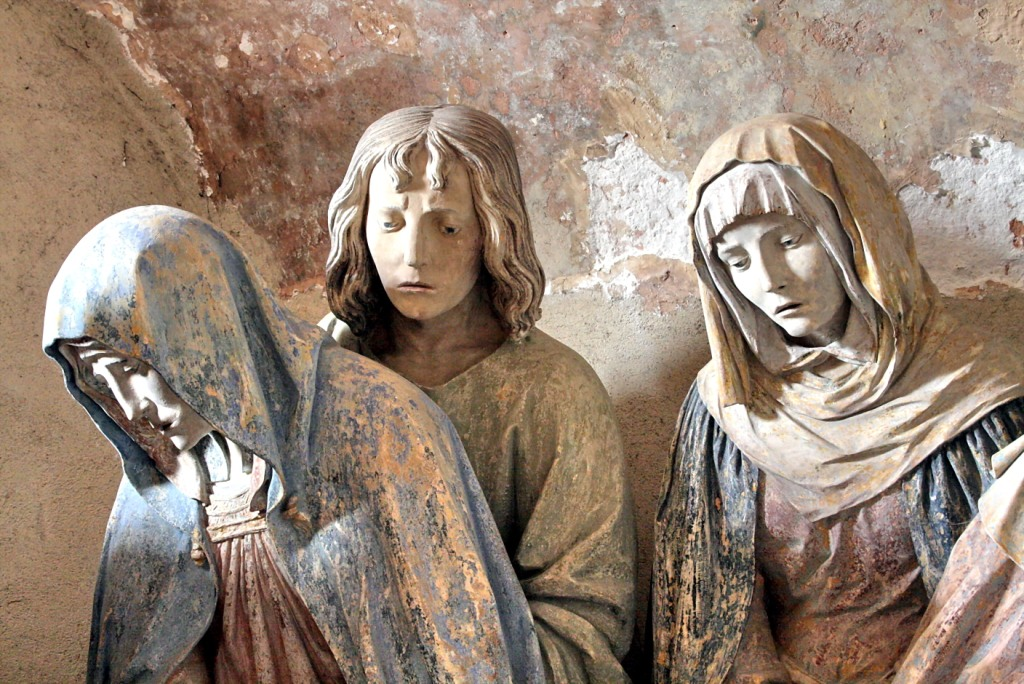
Part of the mise au tombeau in Chaource. The Virgin Mary, Saint John and Mary Salome. Photograph shown courtesy Jean-Marie Kinet

This sculpture in the parish church of Saint-Jean-Baptiste in Chaource in the Aube is the work of the sculptor who became known as the "Maître de Chaource". The composition shows Jesus being laid into His tomb. The group includes Joseph of Arimathea and Nicodemus holding Jesus' body before it is placed in the tomb. Also featured are Mary of Clopas, the Virgin Mary, Mary Magdalene, St John, Mary Salome and some soldiers/guards. The work is thought to have been completed in 1515.

In the brochure "Chaource l'église Saint-Jean-Baptiste et son patrimoine", available in the church, with contributions from Roger Barat, Véronique Boucherat, Laurence Hamonière and Jean-Marie-Meignien, and photographs by Dominique Roy. reference is made to Jacques Badouin's belief that he recognizes the hand of Jacques Bachot in the work and to perhaps further muddy the waters we are reminded that one of the guards carries an inscription reading "Mathieu de Tronchoy". The brochure attributes the work to the Maître de Chaource's atelier believing that the various carvings which make up the group showed the involvement of different carvers.

The church of Saint-Jean-Baptiste contains many treasures apart from the mise au tombeau and many are works from the 16th century. These include statues depicting Saint Barbara, Saint Marguerite, Saint Jerome and a detailed altarpiece depicting the "Passion" in the "Chapelle du Paradis". There is also a depiction of Christ carrying the Cross in the "Chapelle du Porte-Croix".

As the church's brochure says: "Il faut voir ce sépulcre sous diffèrents angles at à toutes les heures du jour pour en apprécier plus complétement les diverses beautés"

== Other works by the Maître de Chaource ==
=== The "Lamentation" or "Déploration" in Villeneuve-l'Archevêque ===
The "Déploration de Saint-Jean" in the church of Notre-Dame in Villeneuve-l'Archevêque in Yonne in Burgundy, is a work which has been attributed to the Maître de Chaource. The church dates back to the 13th century with changes made in the 15th century.

This work has been compared to the " Déplorations" of the great masters; that by Giotto in Padua, by Fra Angelico at Saint Mark's in Florence, by Botticelli in Florence and in Munich, by Andréa del Sarto in Florence, by Véronèse in Leningrad by Poussin in Munich and in Dublin and by Delacroix

Below is one of the most famous works depicting the "Lamentation", that in Église Sainte-Croix in Kaysersberg, Alsace.

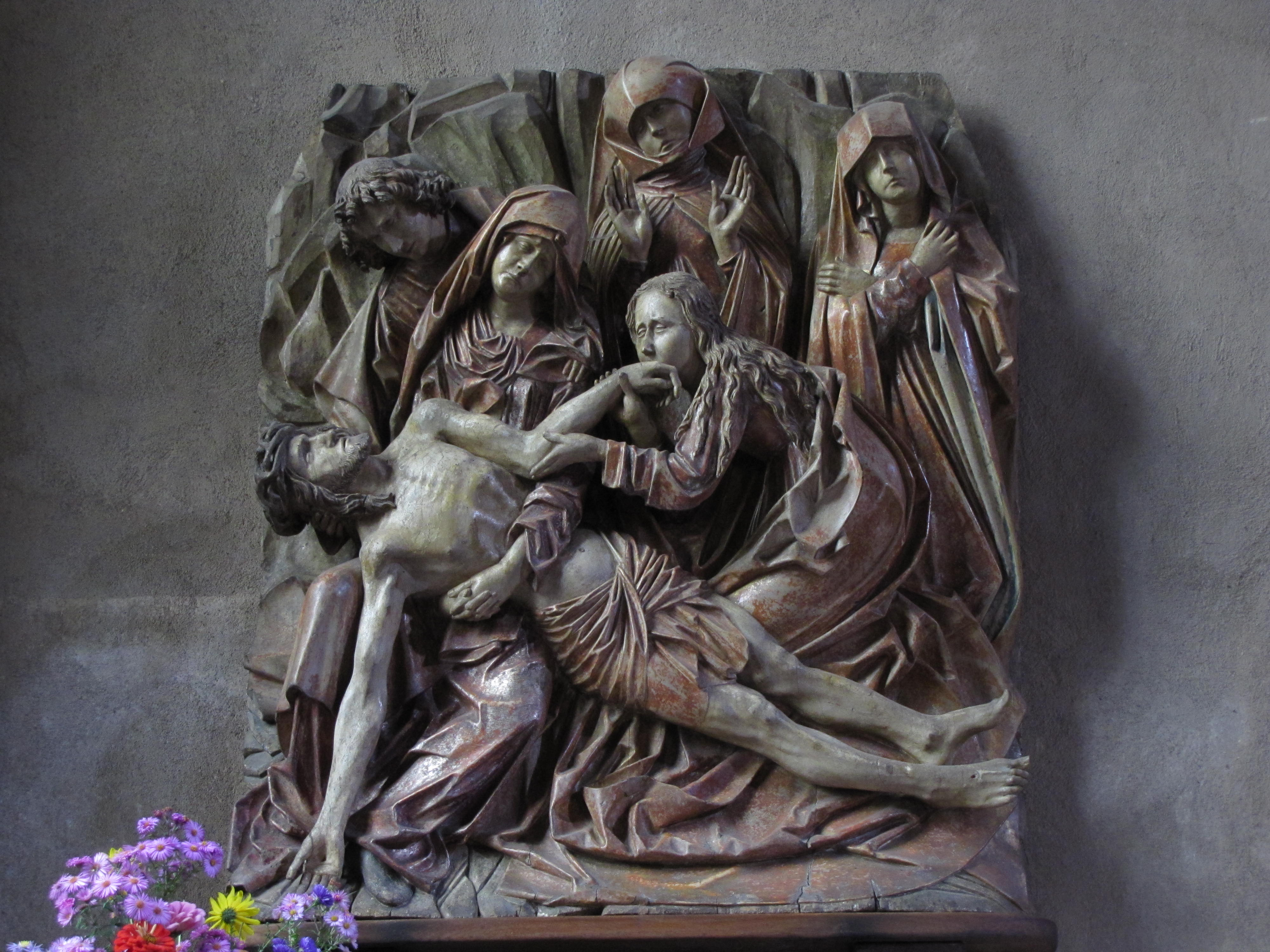
"Lamentation" in Kayserberg, Alsace, by another artist

Arnhold dates the Villeneuve-l'Archevêque work 13 years after the mise au tombeau at Chaource.

In their study of Troyes sculpture entitled "La sculpture à Troyes et dans la Champagne méridionale au seizième siècle" Raymond Koechlin and Jean-J. Marquet de Vasselot state that this work stood for many years in the abbey church of Vauluisant and was a gift to the church by the parents of the Abbé Antoine Pierre, the church's abbé from 1502 to 1528. They make the attribution to the "Atelier de la Saint Martha" which is another name given to the Maître de Chaource's atelier. They date the work to 1528.

=== The Lamentation or "Déploration" in Église Saint-Jean au Marché in Troyes ===
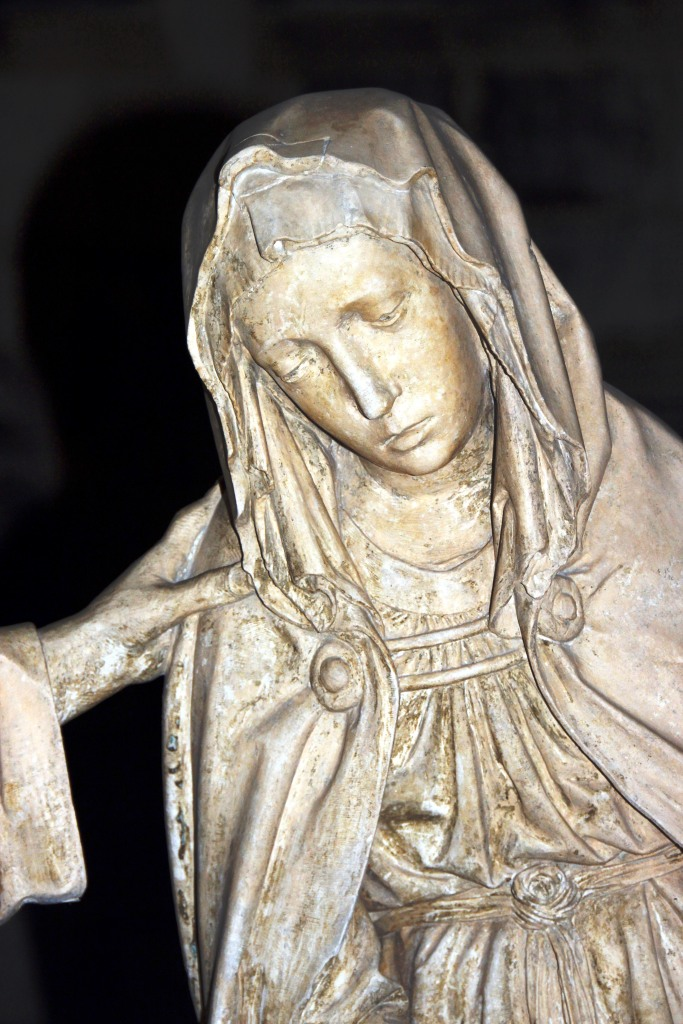
John's hand reaches to comfort the Virgin Mary. Part of the "Lamentation" in the Église Saint-Jean au Marché in Troyes. Photograph shown courtesy Jean-Marie Kinet

This work, showing the Virgin Mary, Saint John and Mary Magdalene grieving over Jesus' body which had just been taken down from the Cross, is located in the Église Saint-Jean au Marché in Troyes. Artists of the time wanted to capture the essential tragedy of that moment when those who had been so close to Jesus had to come to terms with his death.

The "Lamentation", attributed by most scholars to the Maître de Chaource, is shown in the gallery at the end of the article. The work is in limestone with traces left of polychrome and is thought to date to 1525.

This dimensions of the work are 0.73 x 1.42 x 0.50 metres.

=== Saint John and the Vièrge de Calvaire (The Virgin of the Calvary) ===
The statues of Saint John and the Vièrge de Calvaire in the Saint André church at Saint-André-les-Vergers were carved from wood and then polychromed. Some researchers believe the study of Saint John is by the Chaource "atelier" rather than by the Maître himself and Jacques Baudoin in his work "La sculpture flamboyante, Champagne Lorraine"-see page 137, dates the work as being from 1505 and puts forward the view that the two statues came from the Abbey at Montier-la-Celle where they had been part of a crucifixion group. In Saint André's the two figures are placed on either side of a depiction of Christ on the Cross.

The church is rich in 16th-century sculpture and furnishings. Outside the church are sculptures of Saint Frobert and Saint André and in the interior, sculptures include a mise au tombeau in bas-relief, a depiction of Nicodemus, another of John the Baptist as well as a "Christ aux liens et socle" and a "Vierge de Pitié". There is also a triptych depicting the crucifixion and the resurrection.

=== The "Vierge de pitié" in Bayel ===
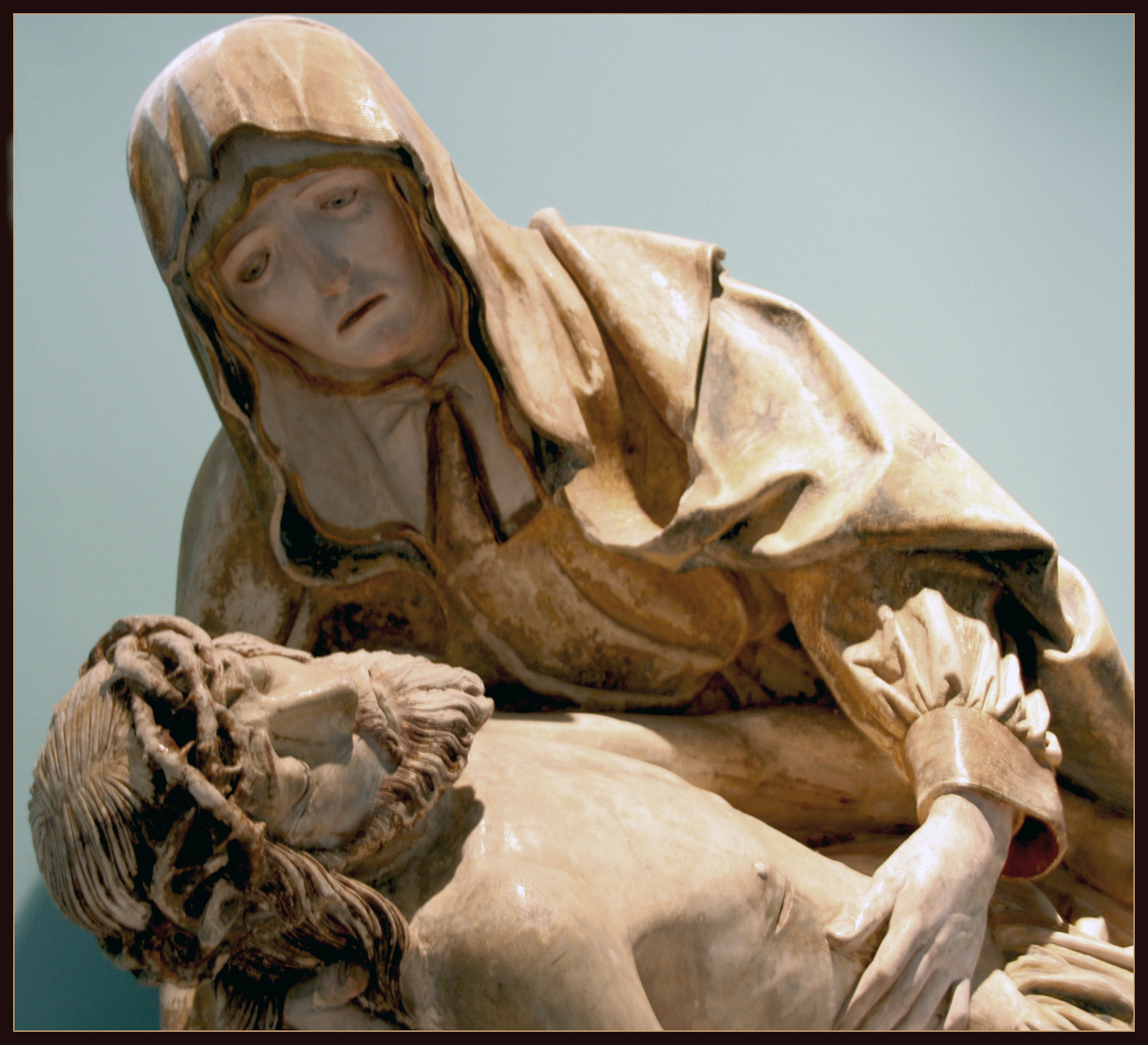
The "Vierge de Pitié" in Saint Martin's church in Bayel

This polychromed statue, as shown above, is located in Saint-Martin's church in Bayel in the Aube and is thought to have been carved in the same era as the Chaource "mise au tombeau". The work is 0.95 metres high and 1.27 metres long and is carved from limestone then polychromed. Originally it was located in the Benedictine priory of Belroy.

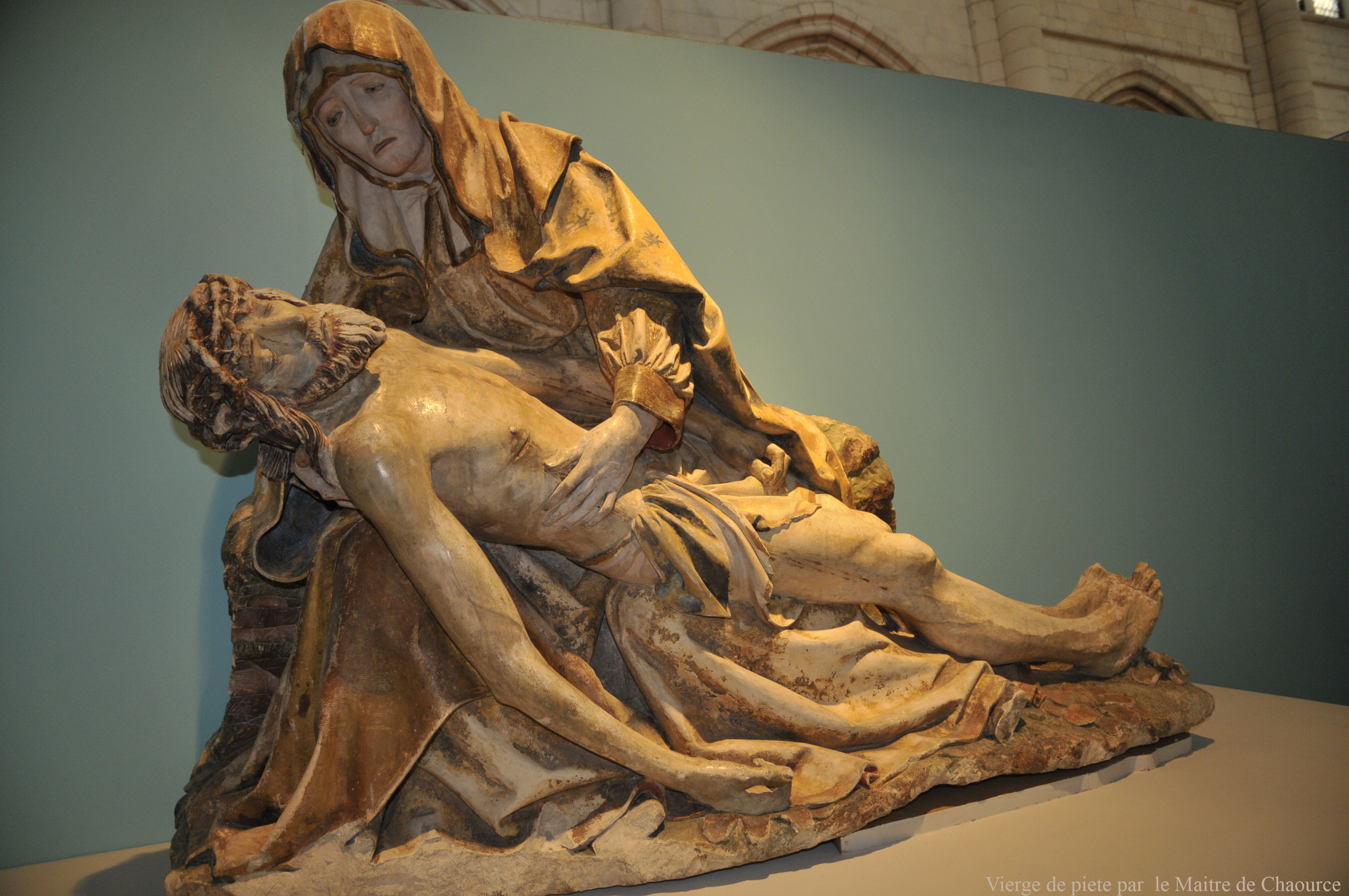
Full view of Bayel work

=== Altarpiece in Marigny-le-Chatel ===
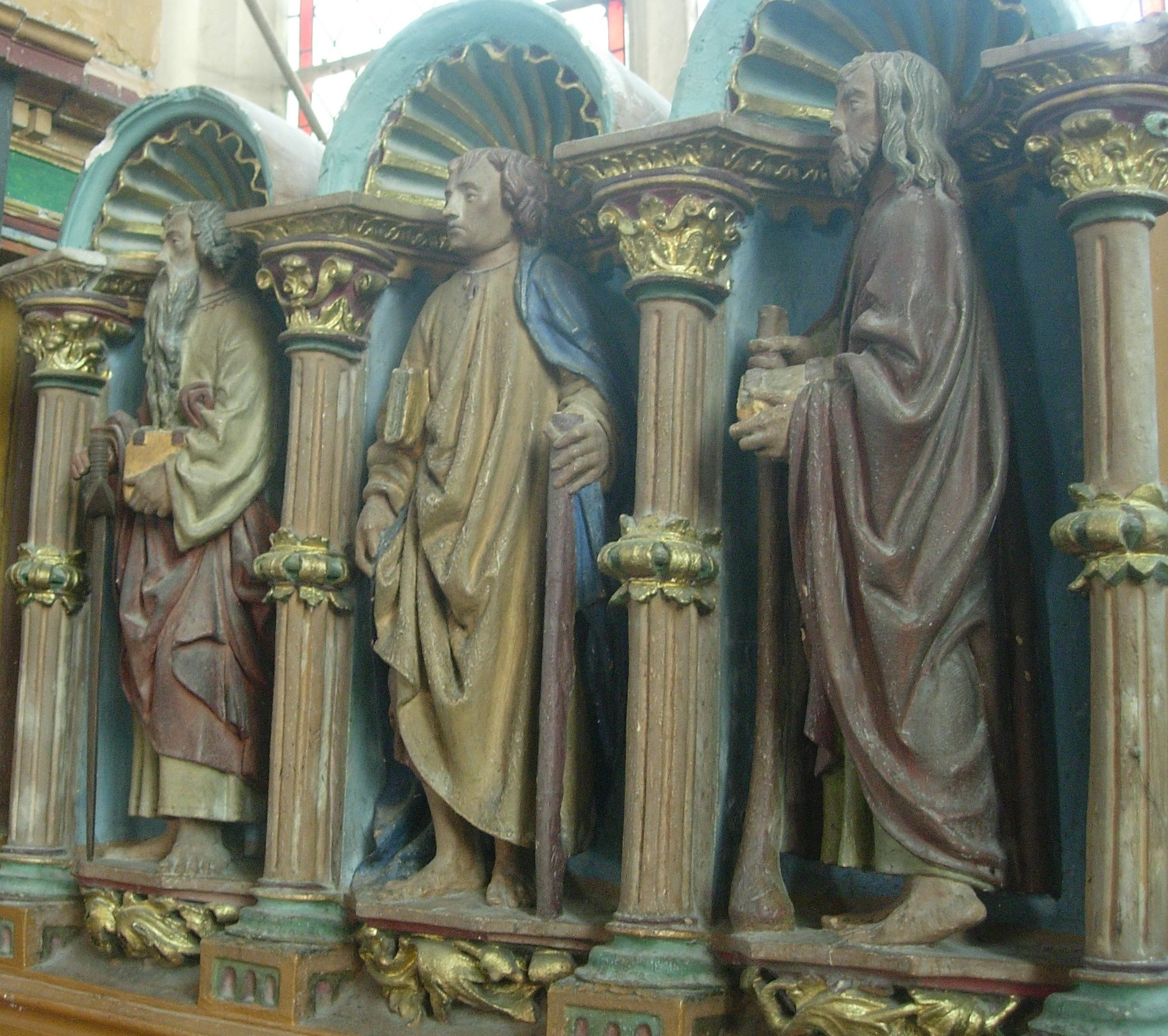
Part of the Marigny-le-Châtel altarpiece

The altarpiece in the church of Saint Maurice in Marigny-le-Châtel depicts the six apostles and is attributed to the Maître de Chaource by most scholars. The church dates back to the 12th century and was originally called St-Pierre-ès-Liens.

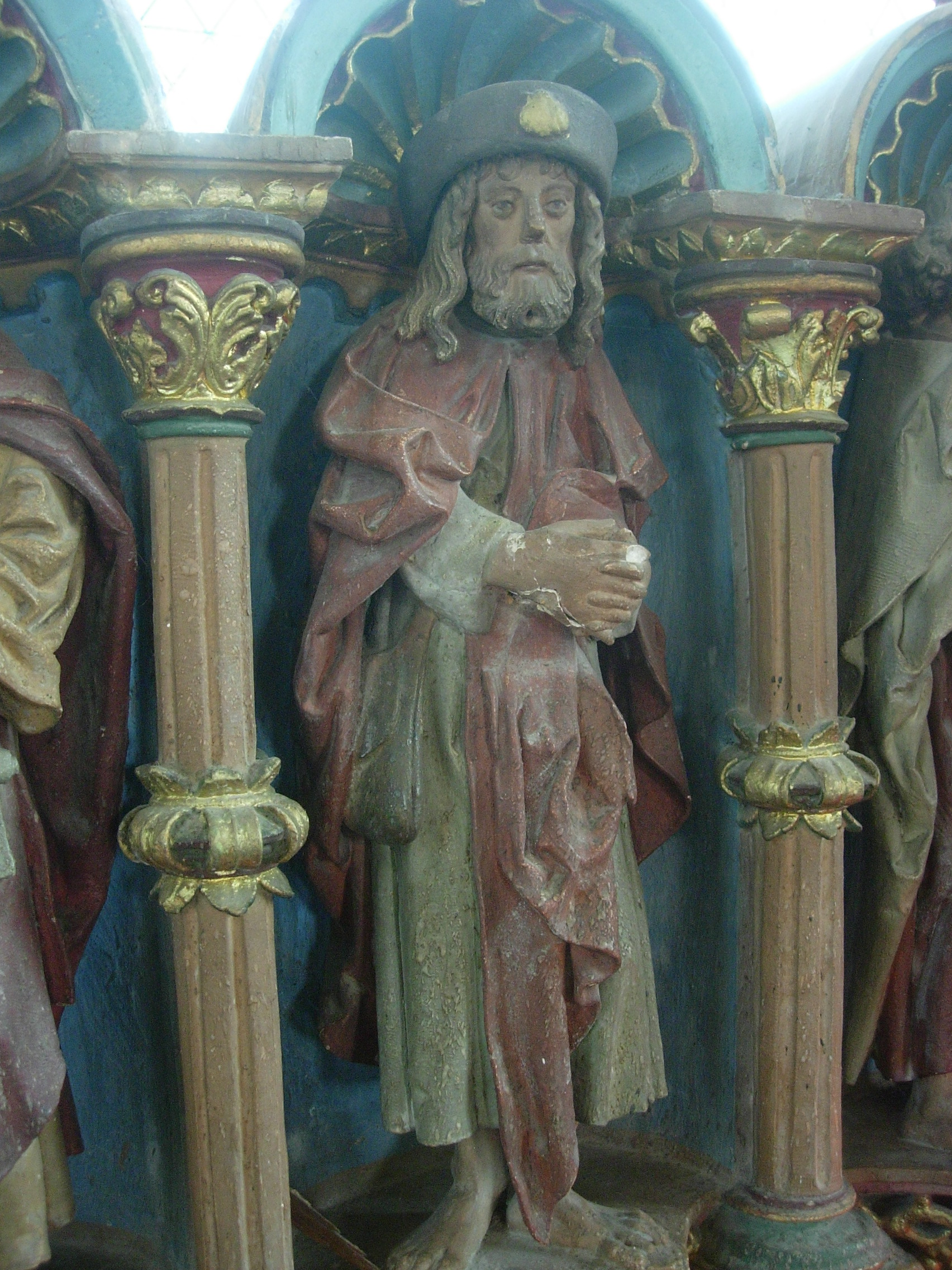
Part of the Marigny-le-Châtel altarpiece

=== Statue of Saint Martha in the church of Saint Madelaine in Troyes ===
Some art historians have claimed that this statue is a depiction of Mary Magdalene rather than of Saint Martha but a study of what the woman holds in her hands does seem to favour it being of Martha. Legend was that after Christ's death, Martha carried out missionary work in the Rhône Valley area and would go about her work carrying amongst other things a pot holding holy water, an aspergillum and a cross.

In the same church there is a statue of Saint Sébastien which has been attributed by some to the Maître Chaource's atelier. In this depiction he wears the collar of the "Order of Saint Michel" founded in 1469 by Louis XI.

In his thesis, Arnhold dates the work as having been executed between 1515 and 1520. A photograph of the statue is shown above courtesy Yvette Gauthier.

== Other works possibly by the Maître de Chaource, his atelier or the École de Troyes ==
Whilst most scholars attribute the above six works to the Maître de Chaource, there are other works of the 16th century and in the Troyes region that some attribute to the Maître de Chaource and others do not. Of course the anonymity of the title "Maître de Chaource" does not help so it may be better to put these under the name "The École de Troyes" or the "École du Maître de Chaource"

=== The work "Ecce Homo" in Troyes Cathedral ===
Depictions of Christ at the time of the crucifixion were much favoured by the sculptors or imagiers of the 16th century and particularly in the Champagne-Ardennes region. Some were entitled "Christ aux liens", others " Christ de pitié". These depict Christ sitting on a rock, this rock often covered by his discarded robe. Often, and to underline the association with the sequence of the "Passion", a skull is put at Christ's feet, reminding us of Golgotha. In these studies Christ is in all probability sitting at Golgotha awaiting his crucifixion and watching the executioners prepare the cross. All these works exude pathos and an overwhelming feeling of despair and hopelessness. The flagellation and the effort of carrying the Cross to Golgatha is over and the agony of the crucifixion itself is to come.

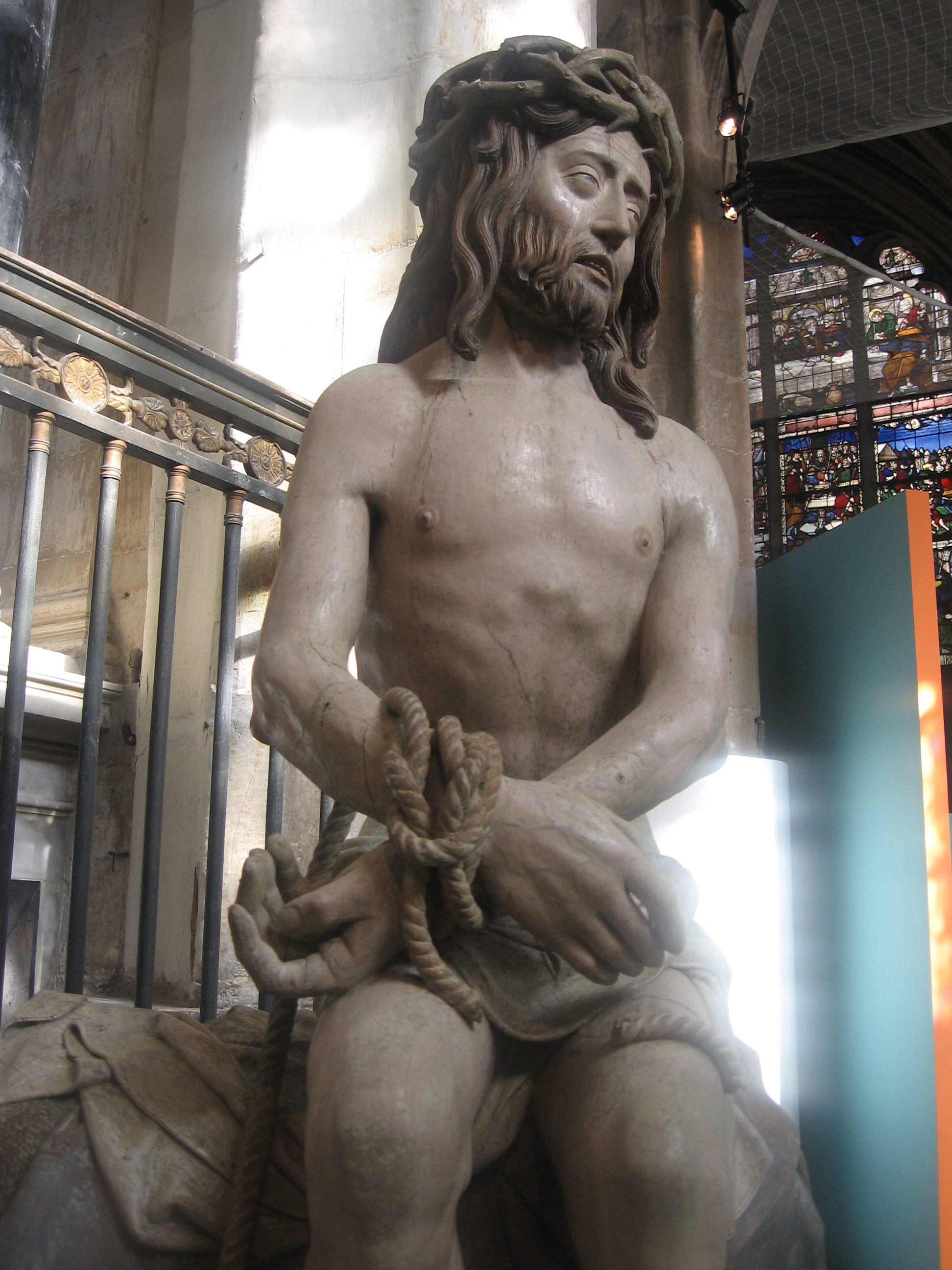
An example of a " Christ de pitié" in Mussy-sur-Seine" This work was included in the exhibition "Le Beau XVIe

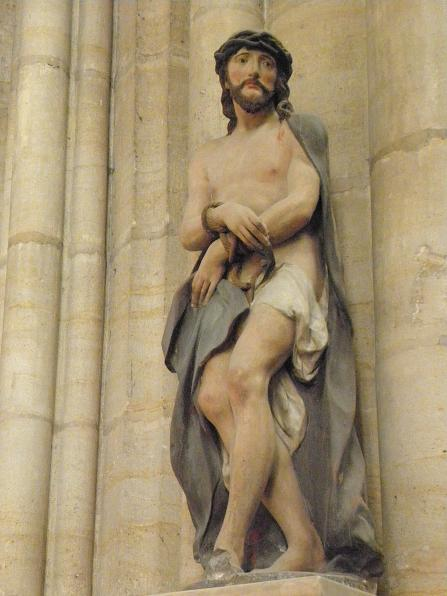
An example of an "Ecce Homo". This work is to be found in the Saint-Urbain Basilica in Troyes.

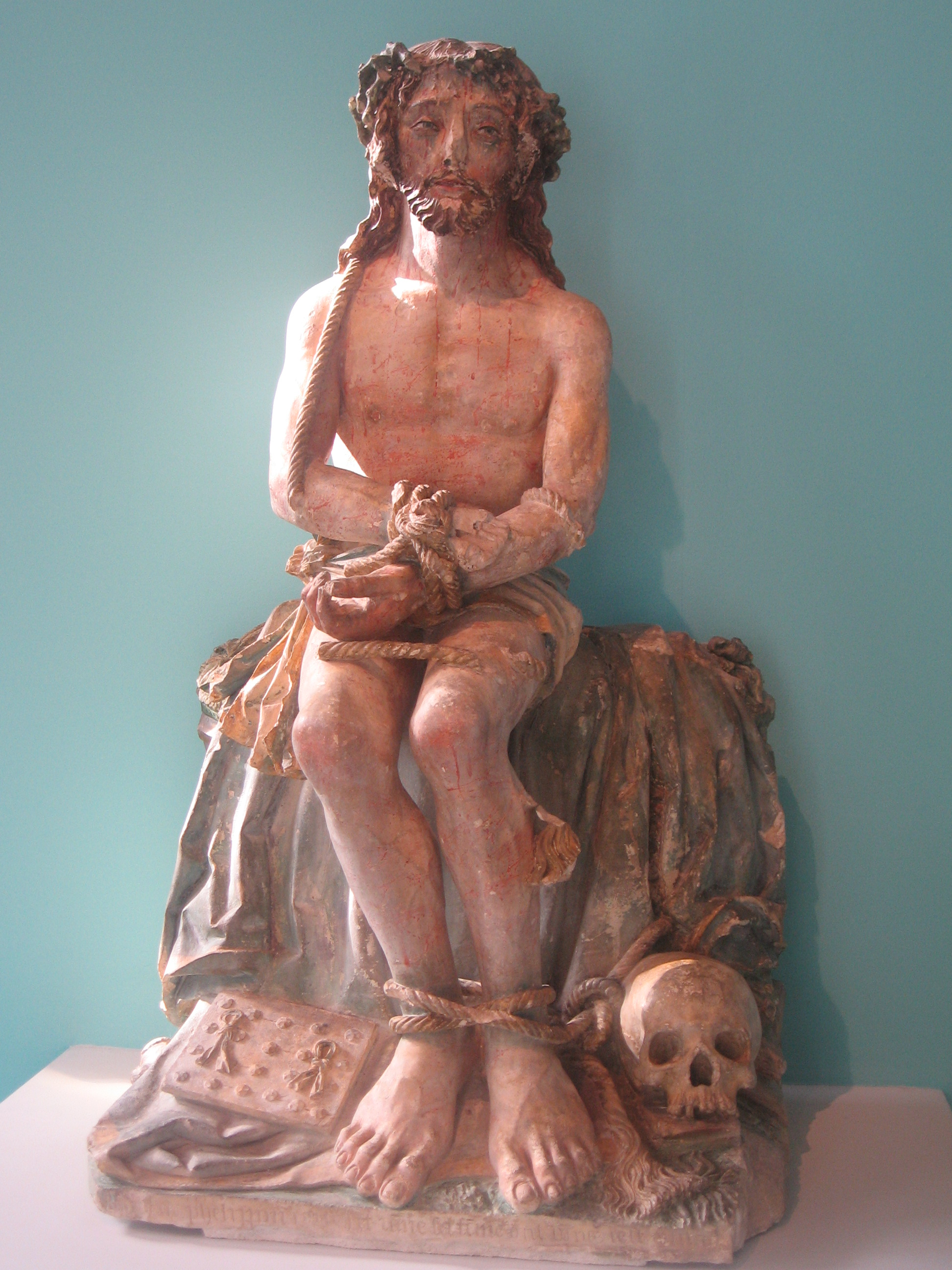
An example of a " Christ de pitié" in Montreuil sur Barse. Also shown in the "Le Beau XVIe siècle" exhibition.

The works entitled "Ecce homo" or "Christ au roseau" refer to one specific episode and that is the episode described in John 19-1 to 19.5. Jesus holds a Roseau, a palm or wears the crown of thorns and a robe.

"Then Pilate therefore took Jesus, and scourged him and the soldiers platted a crown of thorns, and put it on his head, and they put on him a purple robe, and said, Hail, King of the Jews! and they smote him with their hands. Pilate therefore went forth again, and saith unto them, Behold, I bring him forth to you, that ye may know that I find no fault in him. Then came Jesus forth, wearing the crown of thorns, and the purple robe. And Pilate saith unto them, Behold the man! (Ecce Homo)"

The work " Ecce Homo" in Troyes Cathedral came originally from an altarpiece in the chapel of the "Cordeliers" in Troyes. It comprises a life-size depiction of Christ. Arnhold attributes the work to the Maître de Chaource and dates it to 1518 to 1520 and compares the style of the work to the depiction of the apostles in Saint Pouange.

=== The work "Christ de Pitié" in the église Saint-Julien-de-Brioude in Saint-Julien-les-Villas ===
Both Arnhold and Baudoin believe that the figure of Christ ("Christ de Pitié") in the church of Saint-Julien-de-Brioude in Saint-Julien-les-Villas can be attributed to the Maître de Chaource and was one of a series of such depictions of Christ which began with his "Ecce Homo" in Troyes Cathedral, undertaken around 1520. In the Saint-Julien-les-Villas work the Maître de Chaource adds a skull at Christ's feet reminding us of Golgotha. The figure of Christ is carved from limestone and then polychromed. It is 1.37 metres high by 0.61 metres in width. Baudoin disagrees with Arnhold and dates the work to 1510.

The church itself dates back to the second half of the 12th century and was rebuilt in the 16th century in the shape of a Latin cross. It is the oldest building in Saint-Julien-les-Villas.

The church also has 16th-century depictions of Saint Julian, Saint Syre (fr) and Saint Louis as well as a "Vierge de Pitié" attributed to Gentil. Gentil executed a "Christ de Pitié" for the parish church of Sainte-Savine. See Ch Fichot "Statistique monumentale du département de l'Aube, arrondissement de Troyes" published in 1884.

=== "Christ de Pitié" in the Église de la Nativité-de-la-Vierge in Villy-le-Maréchal ===
"Christ de Pitié" in the Église de la Nativité-de-la-Vierge in Villy-le-Maréchal
Arnhold holds the view that the "Christ de Pitié" in the Église de la Nativité-de-la-Vierge in Villy-le-Maréchal can also be attributed to the Maître de Chaource. His reasons are mostly stylistic and he points out the similarities in Christ's hair and beard between the work at Villy-le-Maréchal and the Saint-Julien-les-Villas depiction. He also points out the similarities with the Bouilly "Christ de Pitié". See below.

=== "Christ de Pitié" in the parish church of Saint-Laurent in Bouilly ===
"Christ de Pitié" in the Église paroissiale Saint-Laurent in Bouilly
This church contains many 16th-century works, including a "Christ de Pitié"

This depiction of Christ is 0.72 metres high and, drawing comparisons with the work at Neuvy-Sautour, Arnhold attributes the work to the Maître de Chaource and dates it to 1514.

A forlorn and dejected looking Jesus, "Christ en Pitie"/"Christ souffrant", sits completely naked with hands bound with cord. He sits on a rock which is covered by his tunic.

Baudoin attributes the piece to the Maître de Neuvy, possibly Jacques Bachot, instead of to the Maître de Chaource.

=== "Christ de Pitié" in the church of Saint Nizier in Troyes ===
"Christ de Pitié" in the church of Saint Nizier in Troyes
The "Christ de Pitié" in this church is described thus

"Le Christ de pitié. Cette célèbre sculpture de l'église Saint-Nizier est un chef d'œuvre de l'école troyenne de la première moitié du XVIe siècle. L'air pathétique du condamné (qui regarde peut-être les préparatifs autour de la croix où il va être cloué) est encore accentué par une couronne d'épines qui ressemble à un turban ou à un bonnet. Les mèches de cheveux qui tombent rappellent les papillotes que portaient les juifs pratiquants."

The church of Saint Nizier was constructed in the 16th century and takes its name from the fact that relics of Saint Nizier were deposited in the church in that era. The church was built in the Gothic style and has three 16th-century carvings. One is the "Christ de Pitié" and there is also a "mise au tombeau" and a "Vierge de Pitié".

=== Statues of Peter and Paul in Saint Pouange ===
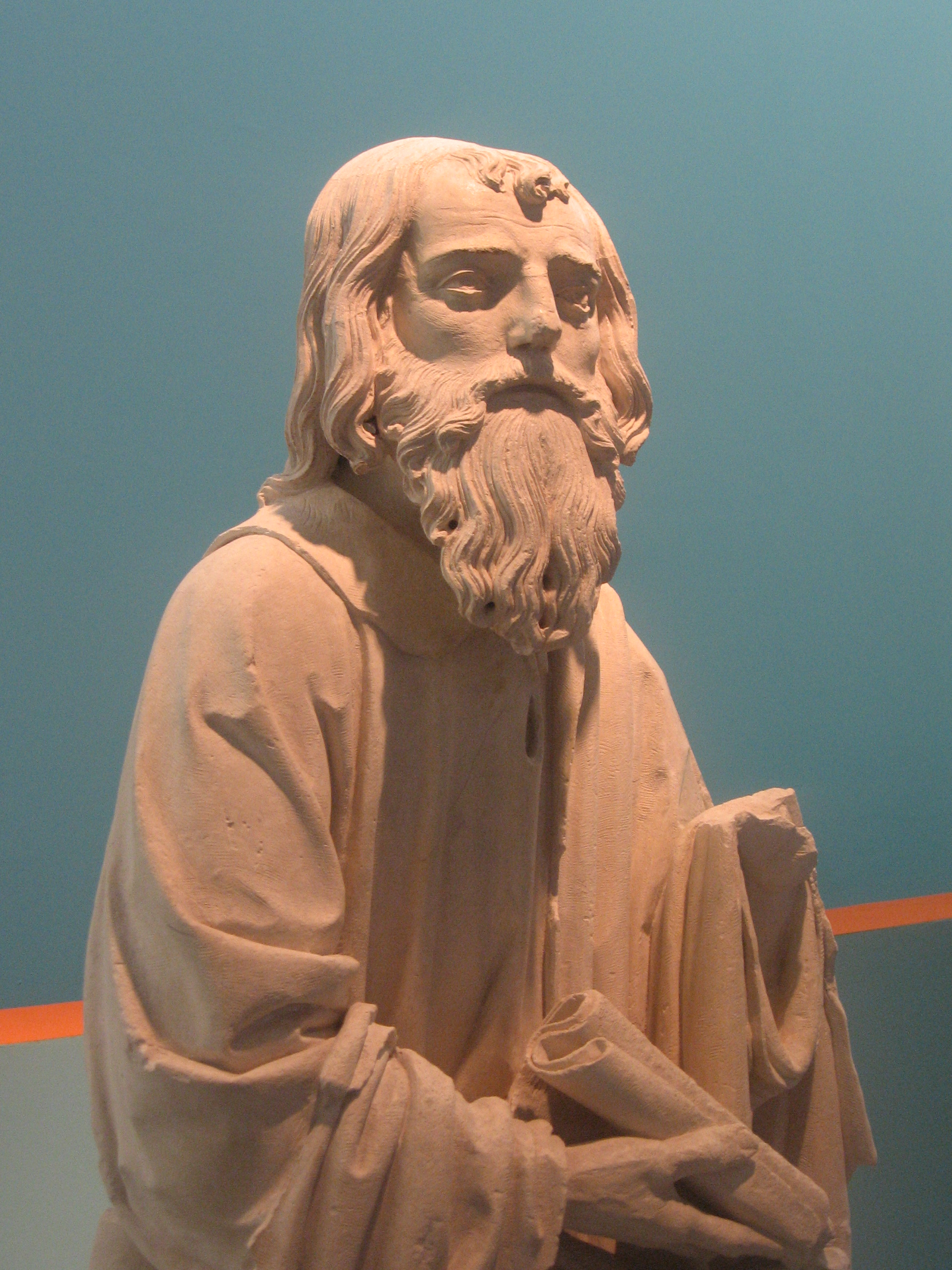
Saint Paul in Saint Pouange

In his thesis Arnhold addresses the possibility of these two life-size statues being by the Maître de Chaource, dates them between 1518 and 1520 and states that there is archival evidence that they were brought to Saint Pouange in 1861, and had previously stood on the west facade of Troyes Cathedral.

The records of Troyes Cathedral show that in 1517/1518 a sculptor called Jehan Briaix prepared some drawings for sculptures of Christ and Peter and Paul, but there is no record as to who subsequently carried out the carving, although it could have been Nicolas Halins, the Flemish sculptor.

Arnhold concludes that for stylistic reasons the work could have been by the Maître de Chaource but is a little more tentative than with other attributions.

Another scholar C.Fichot, already mentioned above, in his 1884 work " Statistique monumentale de l'Aube" states that these two statues could have come from the Troyes church Saint-Jacques-aux-Nonnains or the Cathedral of Troyes.

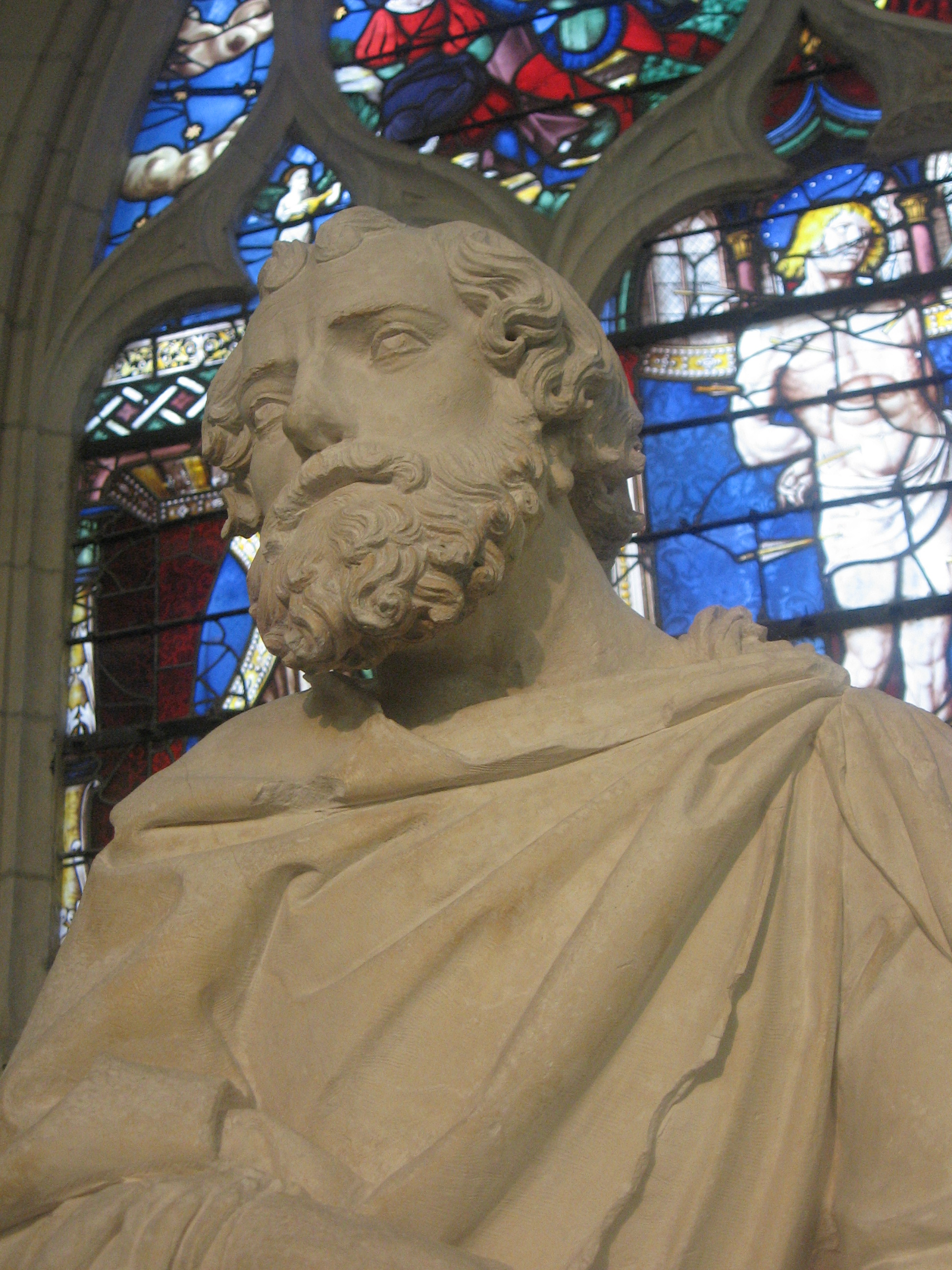
St Peter in Saint Pouange.

=== The depictions of Saint John in the "Chapelle des Annonciades" in Langres ===
The depictions of Saint John in the "Chapelle des Annonciades" in Langres
In the " Chapelle des Annonciades " in Langres there are two statues, one of Saint John the Baptist and the other of Saint John the Evangelist, which Arnhold feels can be attributed to the Maître de Chaource, mainly for stylistic reasons. He draws comparisons in particular between the works in Langres and Saint Pouange and the way the sculptor carved the subject's features and costume.

=== "La belle Croix" in the church of Saint-Symphorien in Neuvy-Sautour ===
"La belle Croix" in the church of Saint-Symphorien in Neuvy-Sautour
The work known as "La belle Croix" in this church is 9.40 metres high and is thought to date to 1514/15 and shows many of the stylistic attributes of the Maître de Chaource's atelier. The work had originally been located in the "Chapelle de la Belle-Croix" but this was destroyed toward the end of the 1900s. In Neuvy-Sautour the cross stands before the altar and there is a sculpture of Saint Claude on one side ad Saint Anne on the other, both on pillars. The cross includes depictions of the Virgin Mary and Saint John plus Mary Magdalene as well as various symbols including a pelican and a "dance macabre which includes the Pope and various dignitaries. The cross was given to the church by the Abbot of Chauvigny in 1514.

=== The Pietà in Mailly-le-Camp ===
The Pietà in Mailly-le-Camp
Arnhold attributes the Pietà in the Mailly-le-Camp parish church to the Maître de Chaource. However, the researchers used by the French government for their "culture" website classify the authorship as "unknown"

See also "The Pietà in French Late Gothic Sculpture: Regional Variations" By William H Forsyth, another much quoted work on this subject.

Arnhold concludes that the Mailly-le-Camp Pietà in Mailly-le-Camp followed on from the Pietà in Bayel. He sees similarities in the features of the Virgin Mary when comparing the face in the Mailly-le-Camp composition and her face in the Saint Jean church "lamentation".

=== Depiction of "Christ falling under the weight of the Cross" in the St Nicolas church in Troyes ===
Depiction of "Christ falling under the weight of the Cross" in the St Nicolas church in Troyes
In the church of Saint-Nicolas in Troyes there is a carving which depicts Christ falling down under the weight of the Cross he is charged with carrying. Some scholars attribute this work specifically to François Gentil and to the École de Troyes.

=== Christ on the Cross at Fueges ===
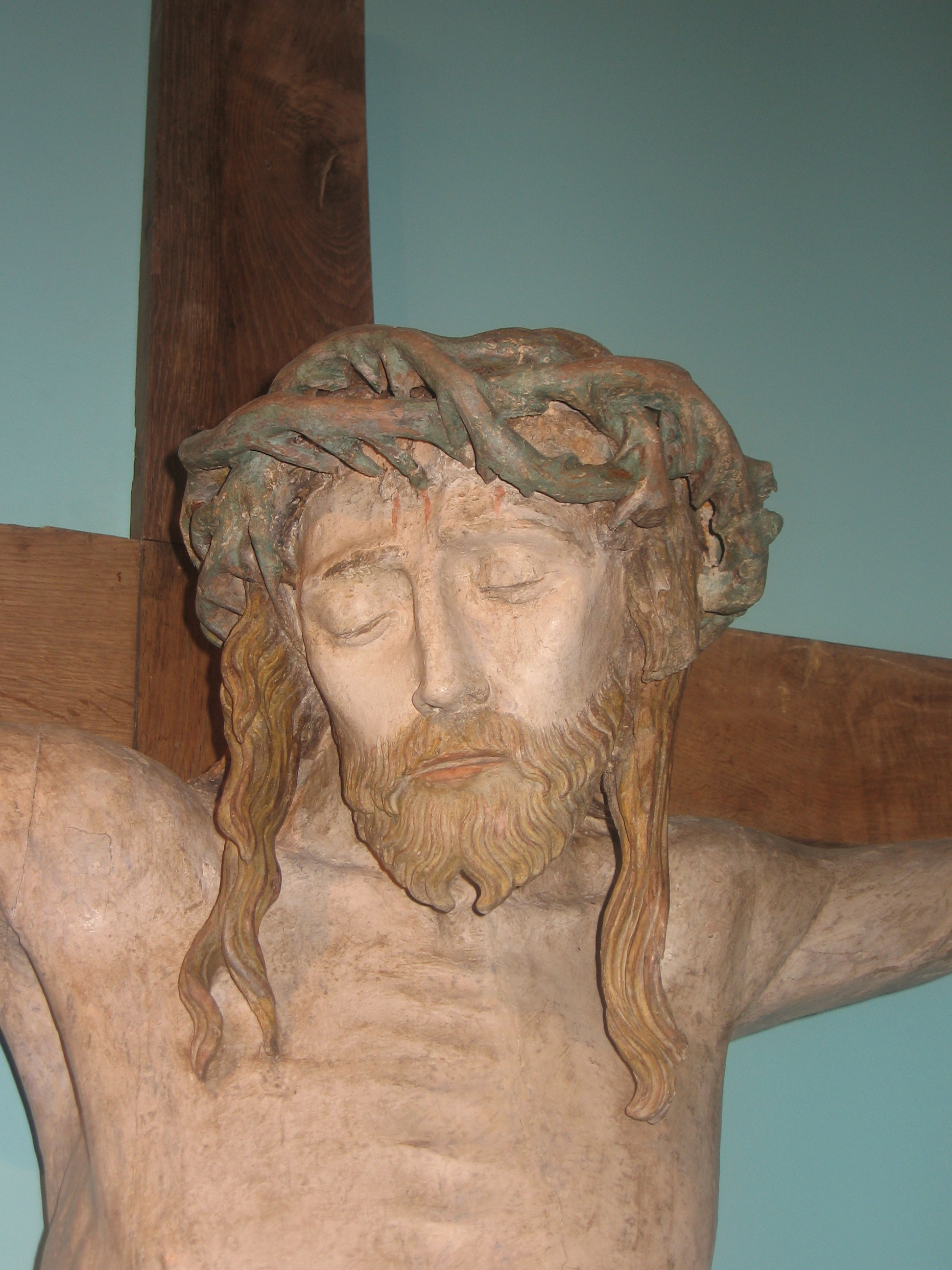
Depiction of Christ on the Cross at Fueges

Arnhold attributes this work to the Maître de Chaource for stylistic reasons and sees similarities with the work in Mailly-le-Camp. He dates the work to 1520. He also writes that carvings of Christ on the Cross in the Musée des Beaux Arts in Troyes could be by the Maître de Chaource as well as works in churches in Avant-lès-Ramerupt and in Mussy-sur-Seine.

=== The Annunciation ===
Relief for a mantelpiece/fireplace in Troyes
A relief depicting the annunciation for a mantelpiece/fireplace in Troyes has been attributed to the Maître de Chaource.

== Gallery of images ==
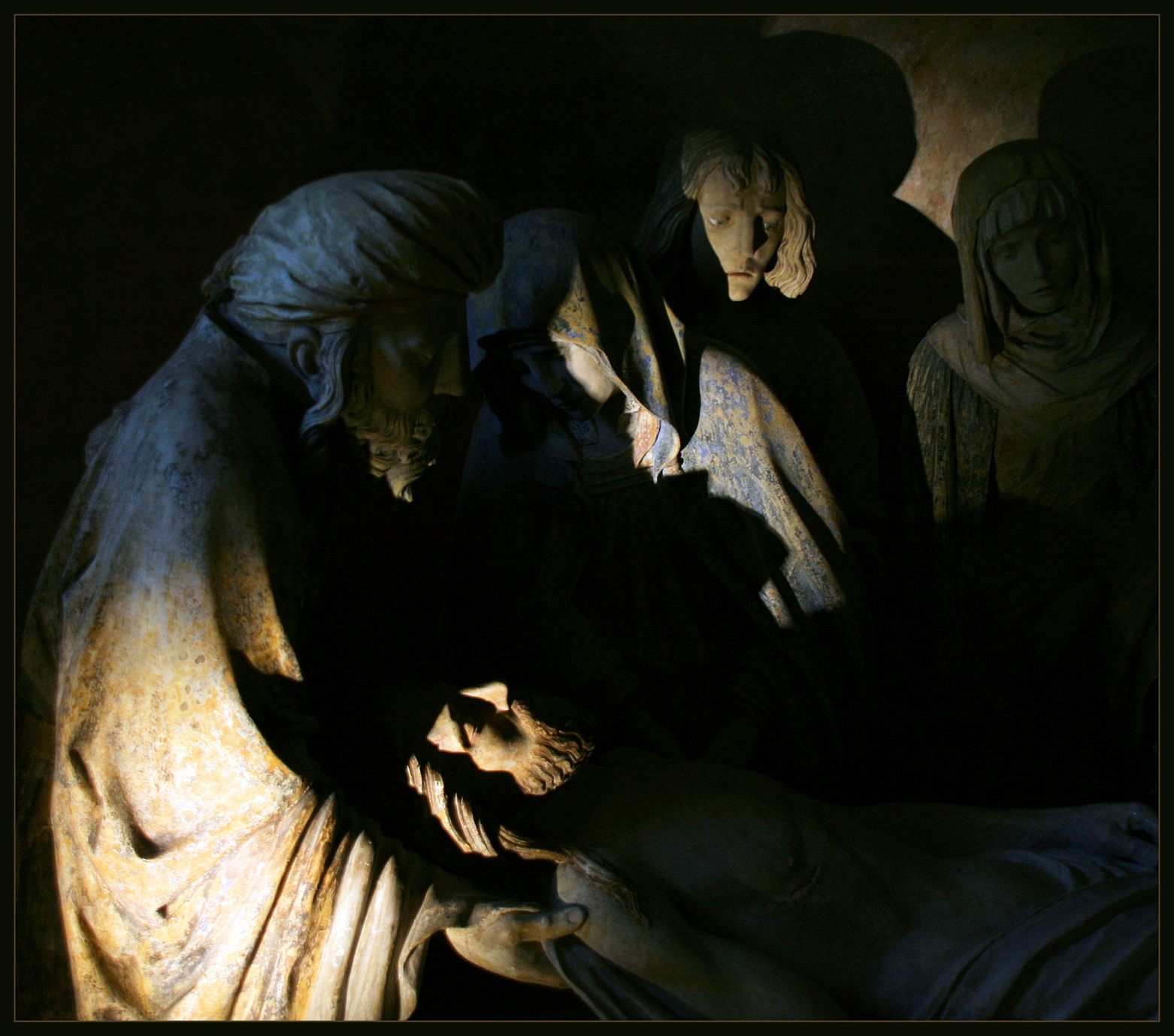
An atmospheric view of the mise au tombeau.

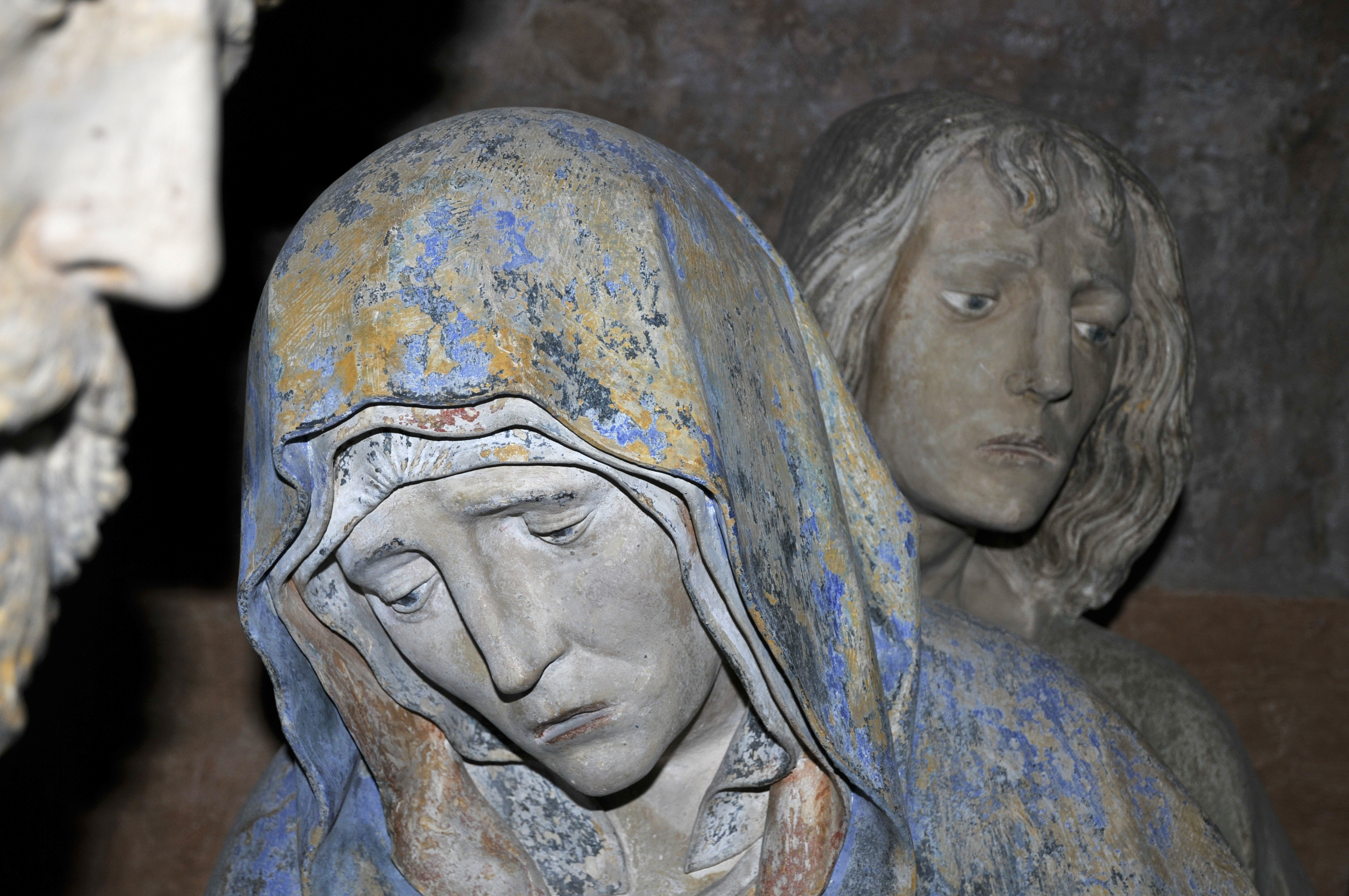
The Virgin Mary. Part of the entombment in the parish church of Saint-Jean-Baptiste in Chaource in the Aube

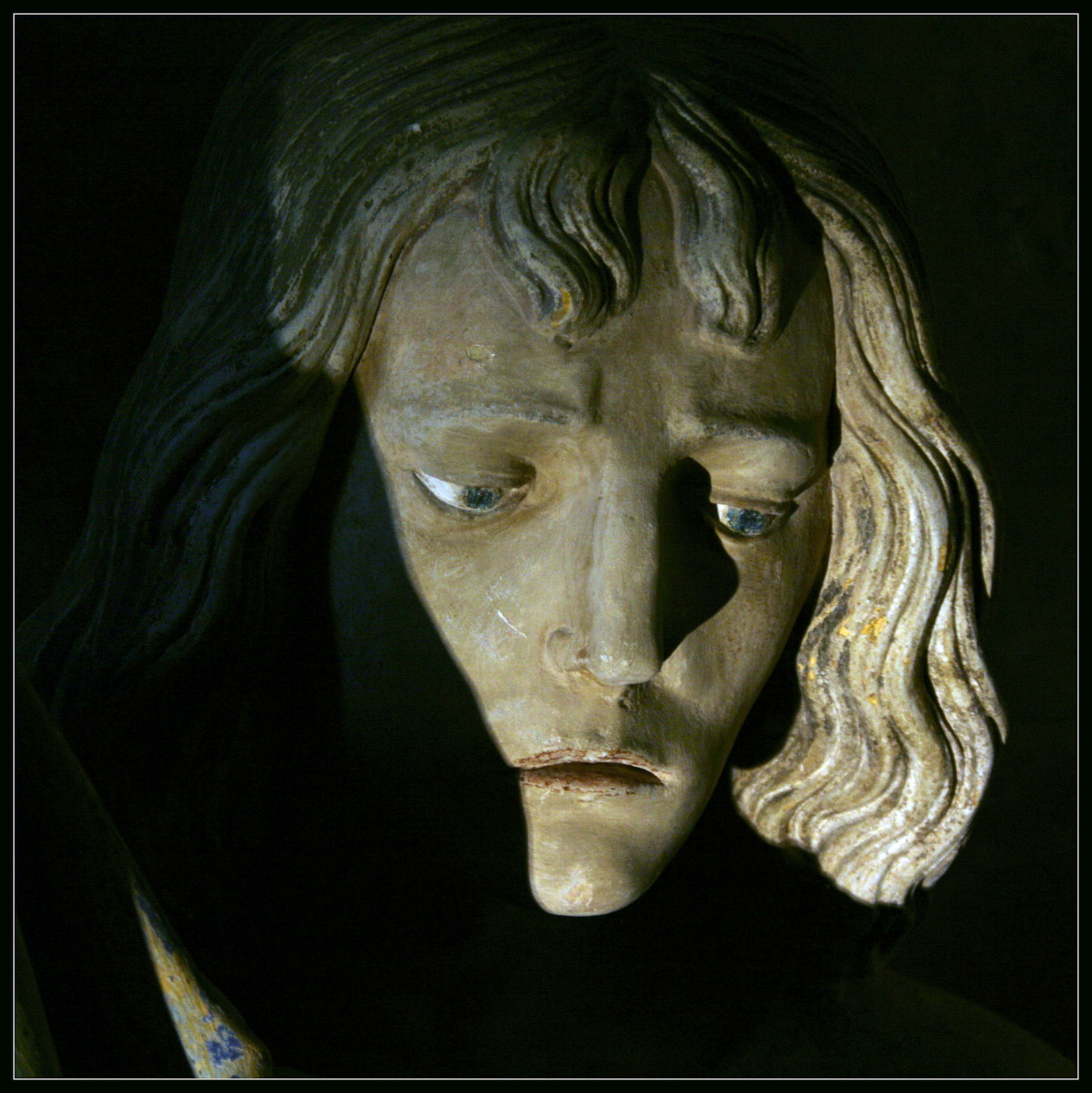
Saint John depicted in the Chaource mise au tombeau.

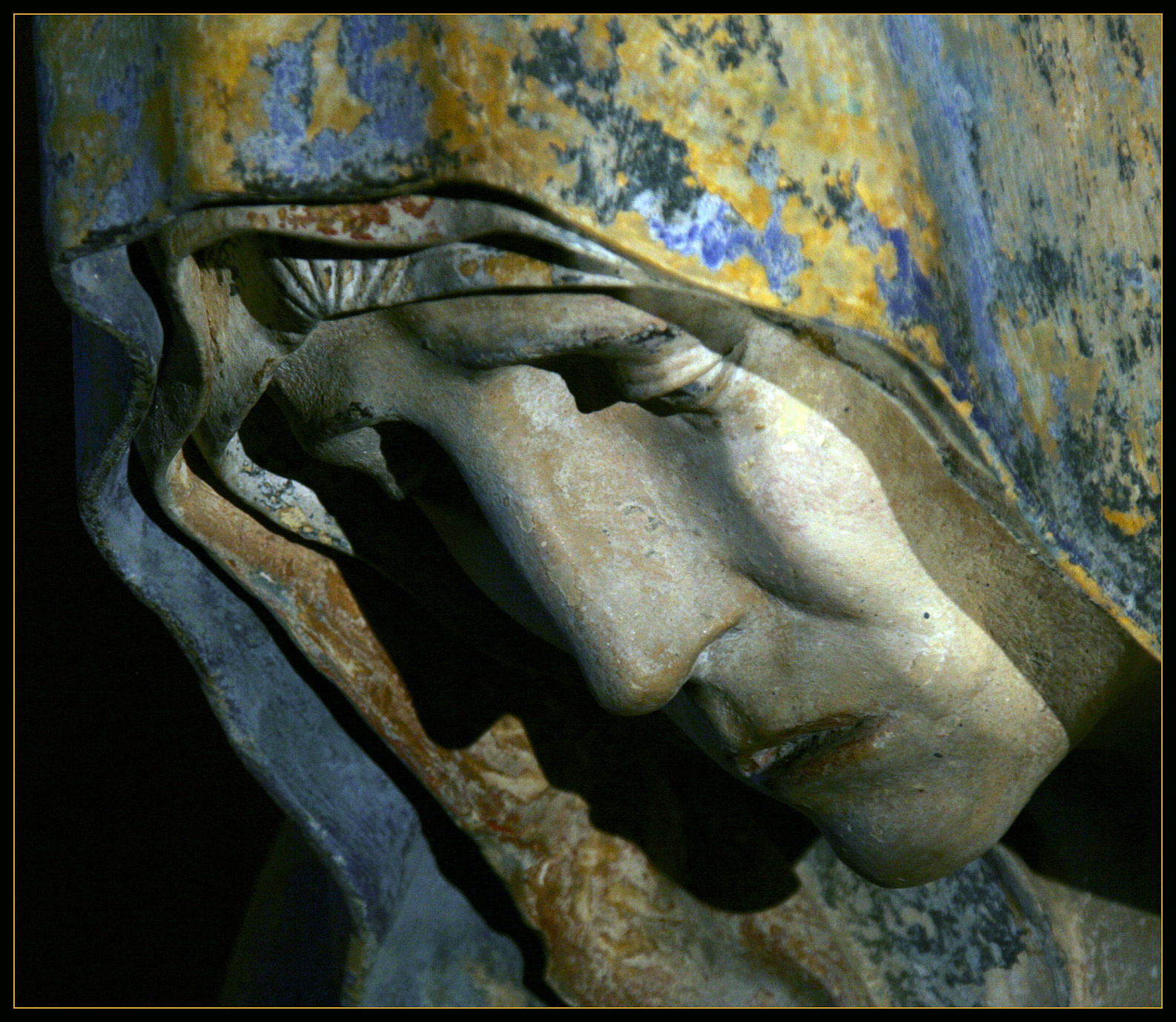
The Virgin Mary in the Chaource mise au tombeau

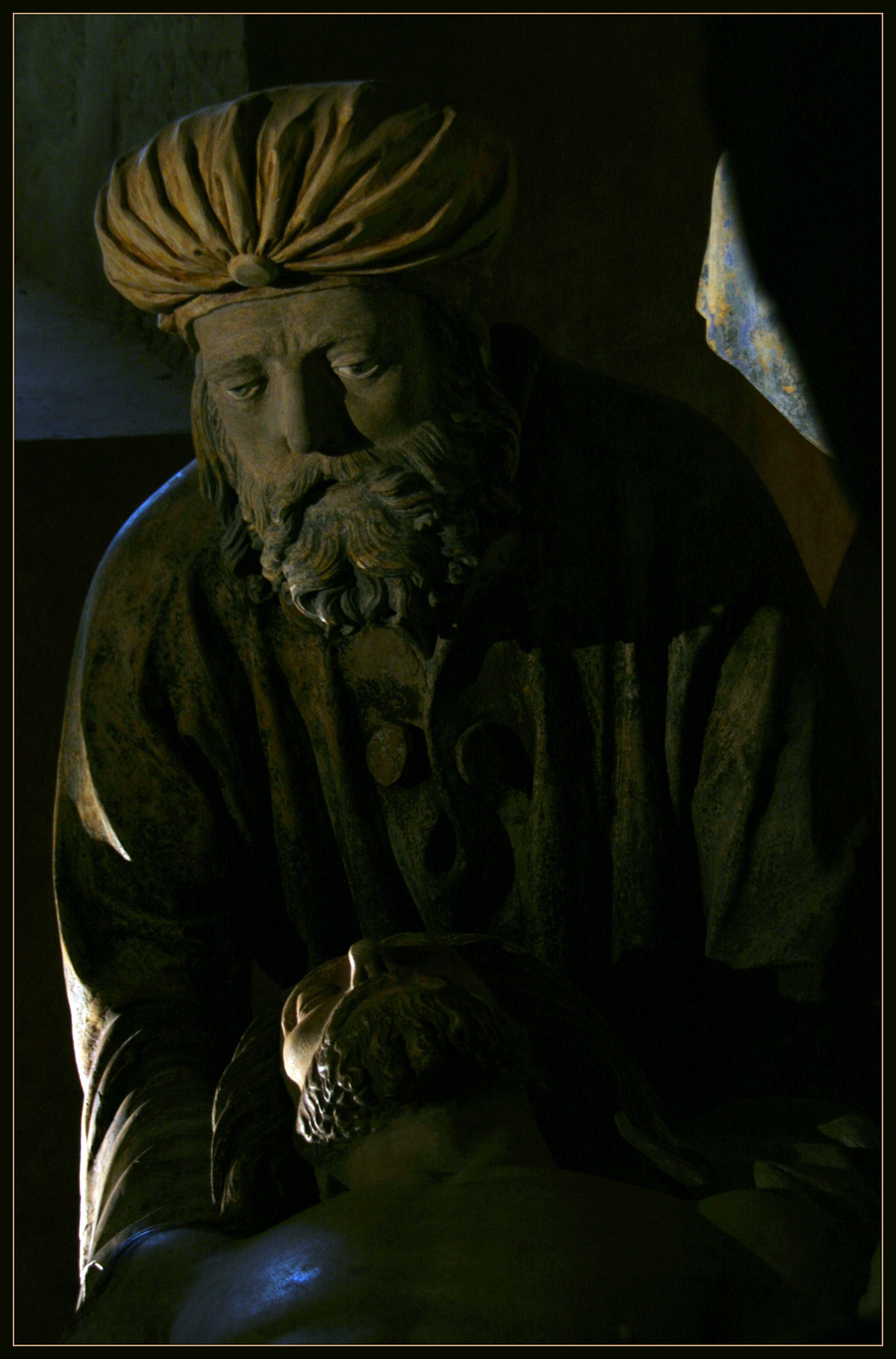
Nicodemus in the Chaource mise au tombeau.

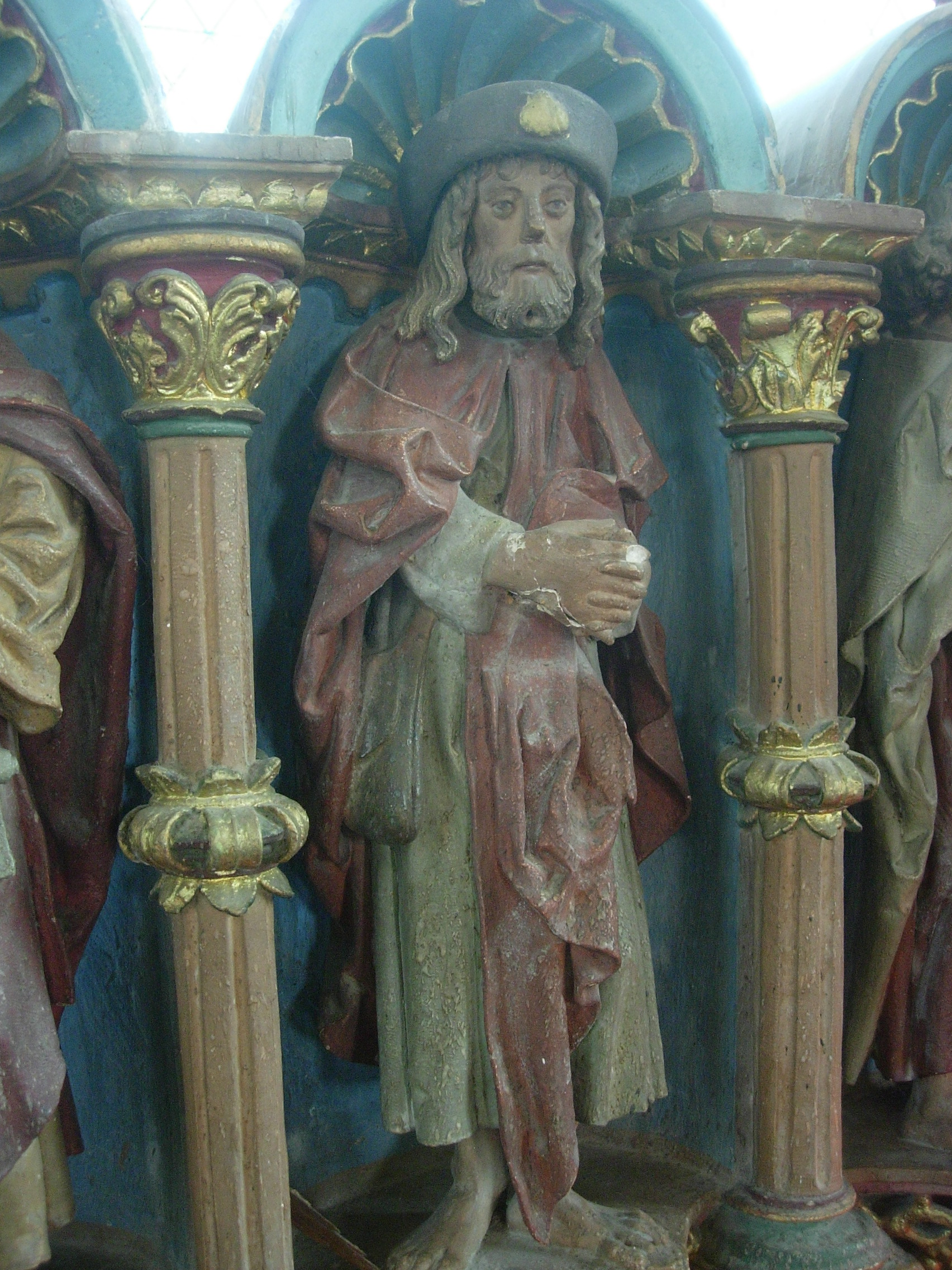
The altarpiece at Marigny-le-Châtel

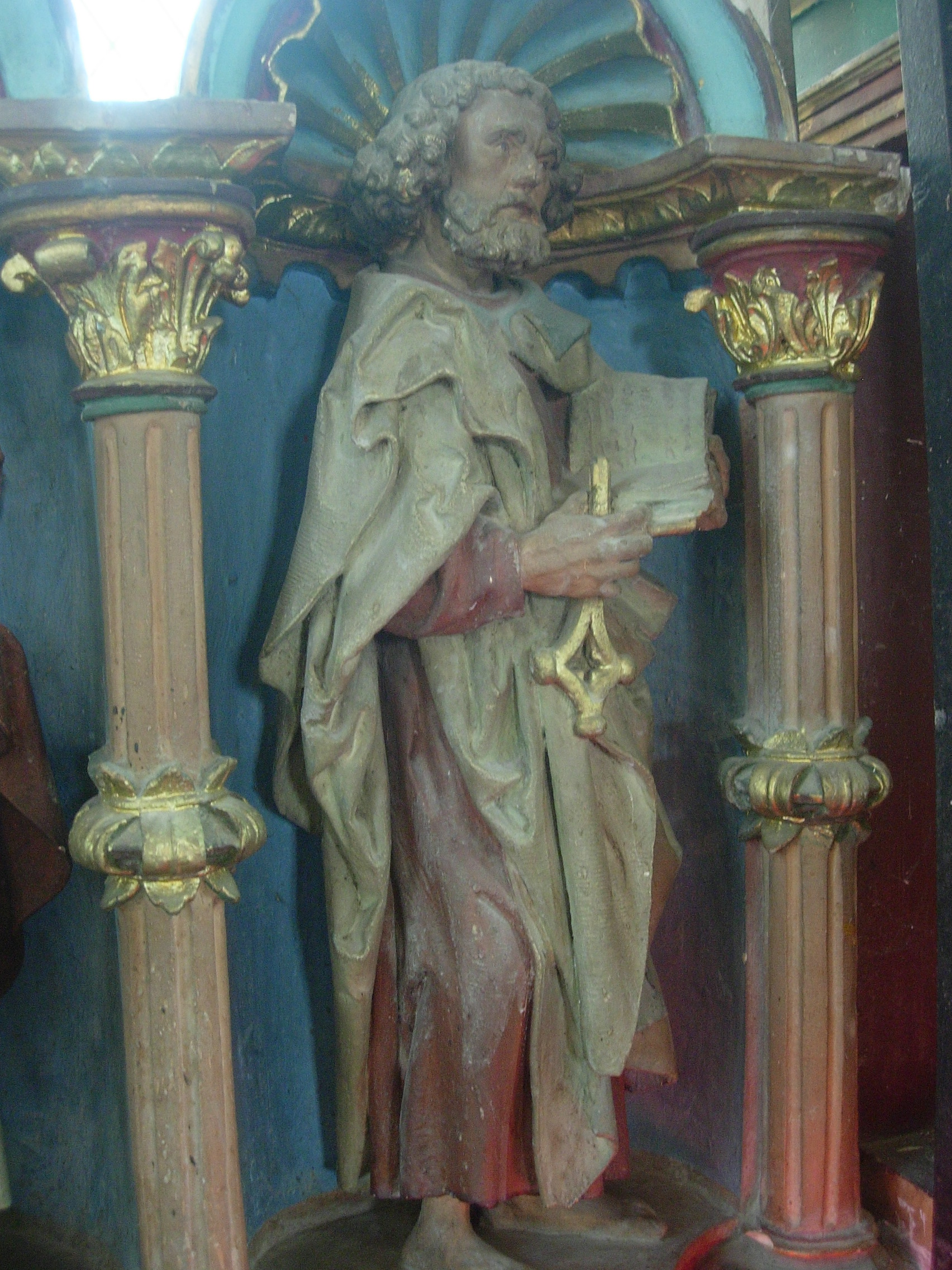
St Peter in the Marigny-le-Châtel altarpiece.

== Other reading ==
- R.Koechlin & M de Vasselot, "La Sculpture à Troyes et dans la Champagne méridionale au 16me siècle". Paris, 1900.
- Dom Éloi Devaux, "Le Maître de Chaource". Paris, Zodiaque, 1956 and Suite à Chaource – Cahiers de l'Atelier du Coeur-Meurtry – N° 40.
- Pierre Quarré, "Le Christ de Pitié en Brabant-Bourgogne autour de 1500" (exhibition catalogue, Dijon, 1971)
- Jacques Baudoin, "La sculpture flamboyante en Champagne". Lorraine, Creer, 1990
