= Chaource cheese =

French soft-ripened cheese

Chaource
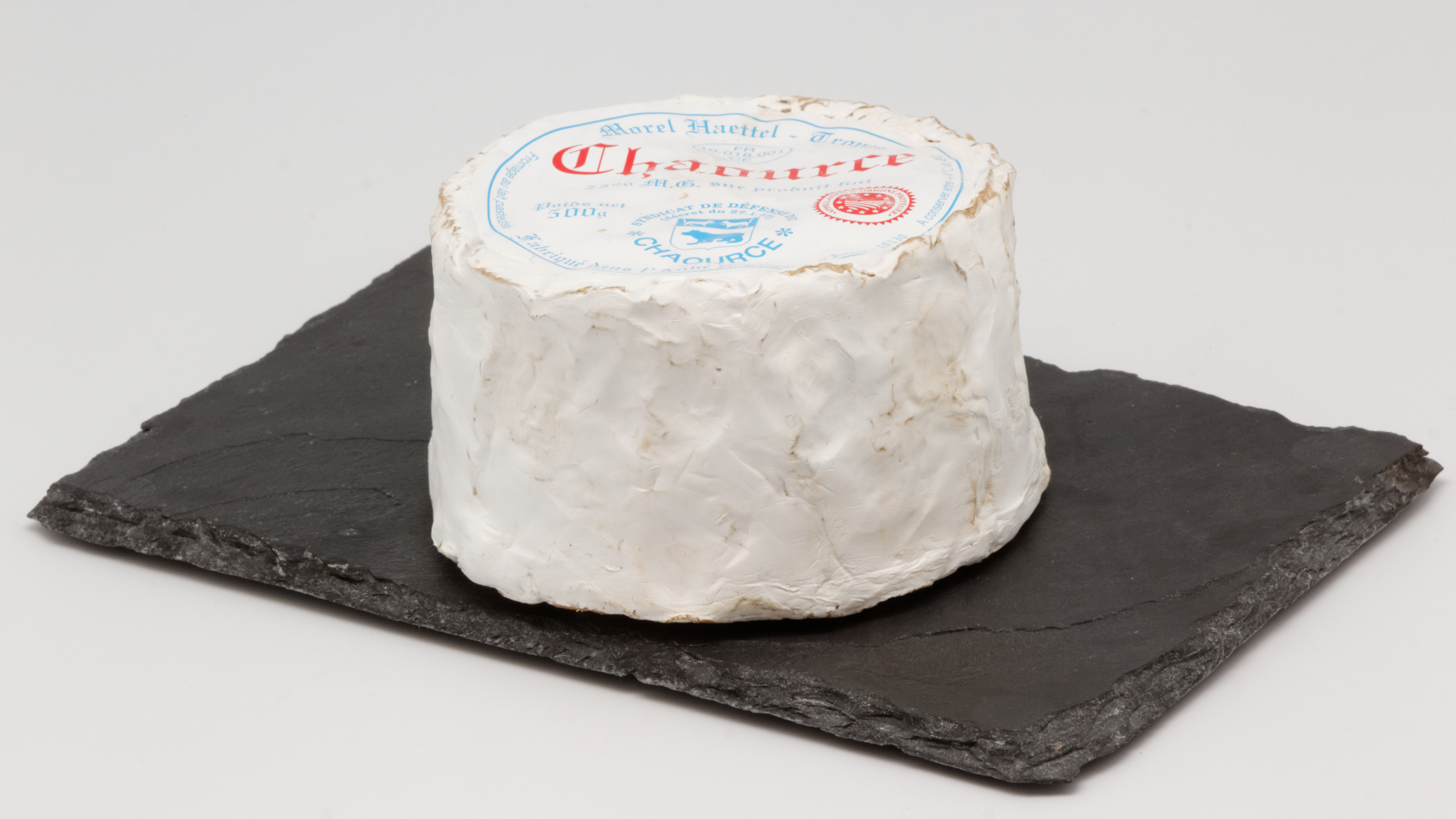
- Country of origin: France
- Region, town: Aube, Yonne
- Source of milk: Cows
- Pasteurised: Depends on variety
- Texture: Soft-ripened
- Fat content: ~50%
- Aging time: 2–4 weeks
- Certification: French AOC 1977
- Named after: Chaource

Chaource (French pronunciation: [ʃa.uʁs]) is a French cheese, originally manufactured in the village of Chaource in the Champagne-Ardenne region.

Chaource is a cow's milk cheese, cylindrical in shape at around 10 cm (3.9 in) in diameter and 6 cm (2.4 in) in height, weighing either 250 g (8.8 oz) or 450 g (16 oz). The central pâte is soft, creamy in colour, and slightly crumbly, and is surrounded by a white Penicillium candidum rind.

== History ==
The cheese has been made in its namesake village since at least the Middle Ages. Cheese is still manufactured there, ranging from small cheese makers to industrial-scale production further away. It is only made in a tightly controlled area in the départements of Aube and Yonne.

== Manufacture ==
It was recognised as an Appellation d'Origine Contrôlée (AOC) cheese in 1970 and has been fully regulated since 1977.

The AOC regulations state that:

- Coagulation must be principally lactic and last for at least 12 hours.
- Drainage of the cheese must be slow and spontaneous.

Made using a similar recipe to that of Brie, affinage is usually between two and four weeks and the cheese is generally eaten young. The gently salted central pâte has a light taste and a characteristic 'melt-in-the-mouth' texture. The fat content is a minimum of 50%.

Regulations currently allow both pasteurised or unpasteurised milk to be used during manufacture.

== Style ==
In her 2010 book Cheese: Exploring Taste and Tradition, Patricia Michelson says: "Chaource has a bitter nutshell-like flavor, with an earthiness reminiscent of the style of the wine here, and you would think it would be a perfect match for the cheese. You should be careful to find the perfect flavor partner, however, because the cheese is also on the salty side."

== See also ==
- List of cheeses
