= Chaource =

Commune in Grand Est, France

- Commune
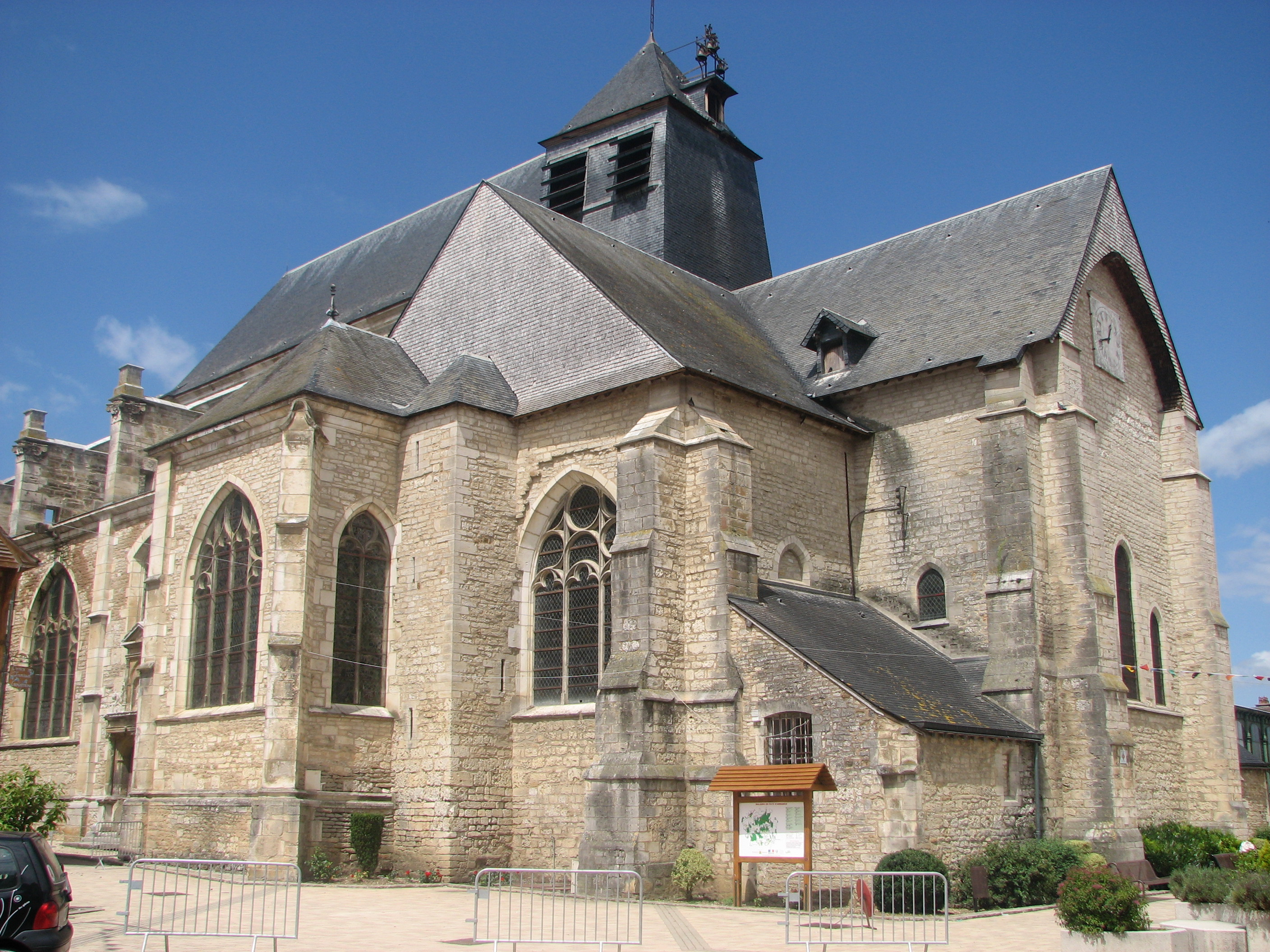
- The church in Chaource

- Coat of arms
- Location of Chaource
- Location within France Location within Grand Est
- Coordinates: 48°03′34″N 4°08′20″E
- Country: France
- Region: Grand Est
- Department: Aube
- Arrondissement: Troyes
- Canton: Les Riceys

Government
  - Mayor (2020–2026): Florent Hurpeau
- Area^{1}: 31.06 km^{2} (11.99 sq mi)
- Elevation: 150 m (490 ft)
- Highest elevation: 233 m (764 ft)
- Lowest elevation: 134 m (440 ft)
- Population (2023): 1,011
  - Density: 32.55/km^{2} (84.30/sq mi)
- Time zone: UTC+01:00 (CET)
  - Summer (DST): UTC+02:00 (CEST)
- INSEE/Postal code: 10080 /10210
- Website: www.chaource.fr
- ^{1} French Land Register data, which excludes lakes, ponds, glaciers > 1 km^{2} (0.386 sq mi or 247 acres) and river estuaries.

Chaource (French pronunciation: [ʃa.uʁs]) is a commune in the Aube department in north-central France. Chaource cheese is named after this town.

In the Chaource parish church there is a sculpture of the Entombment of Christ, made by the Maître de Chaource in 1515.

== Population ==
Historical population
Year	Pop.	±% p.a.
1968	971	—
1975	965	−0.09%
1982	1,106	+1.97%
1990	1,031	−0.87%
1999	1,092	+0.64%
2007	1,105	+0.15%
2012	1,154	+0.87%
2017	1,081	−1.30%
2023	1,011	−1.11%
Source: INSEE

== See also ==
- Communes of the Aube department
