= Balnot-sur-Laignes =

Commune in Grand Est, France

- Commune
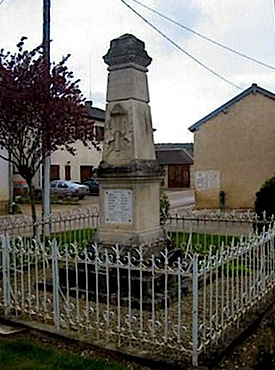
- War memorial
- Location of Balnot-sur-Laignes
- Location within France Location within Grand Est
- Coordinates: 48°01′58″N 4°21′57″E
- Country: France
- Region: Grand Est
- Department: Aube
- Arrondissement: Troyes
- Canton: Les Riceys
- Intercommunality: Barséquanais en Champagne

Government
  - Mayor (2020–2026): Éric Fournier
- Area^{1}: 10.13 km^{2} (3.91 sq mi)
- Elevation: 176 m (577 ft)
- Population (2023): 150
  - Density: 15/km^{2} (38/sq mi)
- Time zone: UTC+01:00 (CET)
  - Summer (DST): UTC+02:00 (CEST)
- INSEE/Postal code: 10029 /10110
- ^{1} French Land Register data, which excludes lakes, ponds, glaciers > 1 km^{2} (0.386 sq mi or 247 acres) and river estuaries.

Balnot-sur-Laignes (French pronunciation: [balno syʁ lɛɲ]) is a commune in the Aube department in the Grand Est region of north-central France.

The commune has been awarded one flower by the National Council of Towns and Villages in Bloom in the Competition of cities and villages in Bloom.

== Geography ==
Balnot-sur-Laignes is located some 35 km south-east of Troyes and 10 km south of Bar-sur-Seine. Access to the commune is by the D452 road from Polisy in the north which passes down the eastern side of the commune just east of the village and continues south to Les Riceys. The D26 comes from Neuville-sur-Seine in the east and passes through the village continuing south-west to Bagneux-la-Fosse. The D184 from Avirey-Lingey passes through the western arm of the commune going north-west to join the D36. The commune is farmland in the east and west with a belt of dense forest through the centre.

The Laignes river forms the eastern border of the commune as it flows north to join the Seine at Polisy.

== History ==
During the French Revolution the commune, which had been called Balnot-le-Châtel, changed its name to Balnot-sur-Laignes.

== Administration ==
List of Successive Mayors

From	To	Name
	1857	Morel
	1887	Jean Baptiste Claude Edouard Tetevide
2001	2026	Éric Fournier

== Demography ==
The inhabitants of the commune are known as Balnotiers or Balnotières in French.

Historical population

Year	Pop.	±% p.a.
1793	636	—
1821	588	−0.28%
1846	328	−2.31%
1872	420	+0.96%
1901	371	−0.43%
1926	266	−1.32%
1946	202	−1.37%
1962	162	−1.37%
1968	172	+1.00%

Year	Pop.	±% p.a.
1975	153	−1.66%
1982	149	−0.38%
1990	158	+0.74%
1999	175	+1.14%
2007	159	−1.19%
2012	161	+0.25%
2017	155	−0.76%
2023	150	−0.55%

Source: EHESS and INSEE

== Sites and monuments ==
A War Memorial for French Pacifists with the inscription "Maudite soit la guerre" (Cursed be war).

The Parish Church contains many items that are registered as historical monuments:

- A Painting: the three Mary (19th century)
- 2 banks of Pews (18th century)
- A Sculpture (1629)
- A Painting: The Annunciation (19th century)
- A Retable (18th century)
- A Stall (18th century)
- A Baptismal font (19th century)
- 2 Door Panels (16th century)
- A Sculpture: Christ on the Cross (16th century)
- A Tombstone for Pierre-Louis Bourgeois (1771)
- The main Altar and Retable (18th century)
- Statues (16th century)
- A Group Sculpture: Education of the Virgin (16th century)
- A Group Sculpture: Education of the Virgin (16th century)
- The Furniture in the Church

== See also ==
- Communes of the Aube department
