= Arrelles =

Commune in Grand Est, France

- Commune
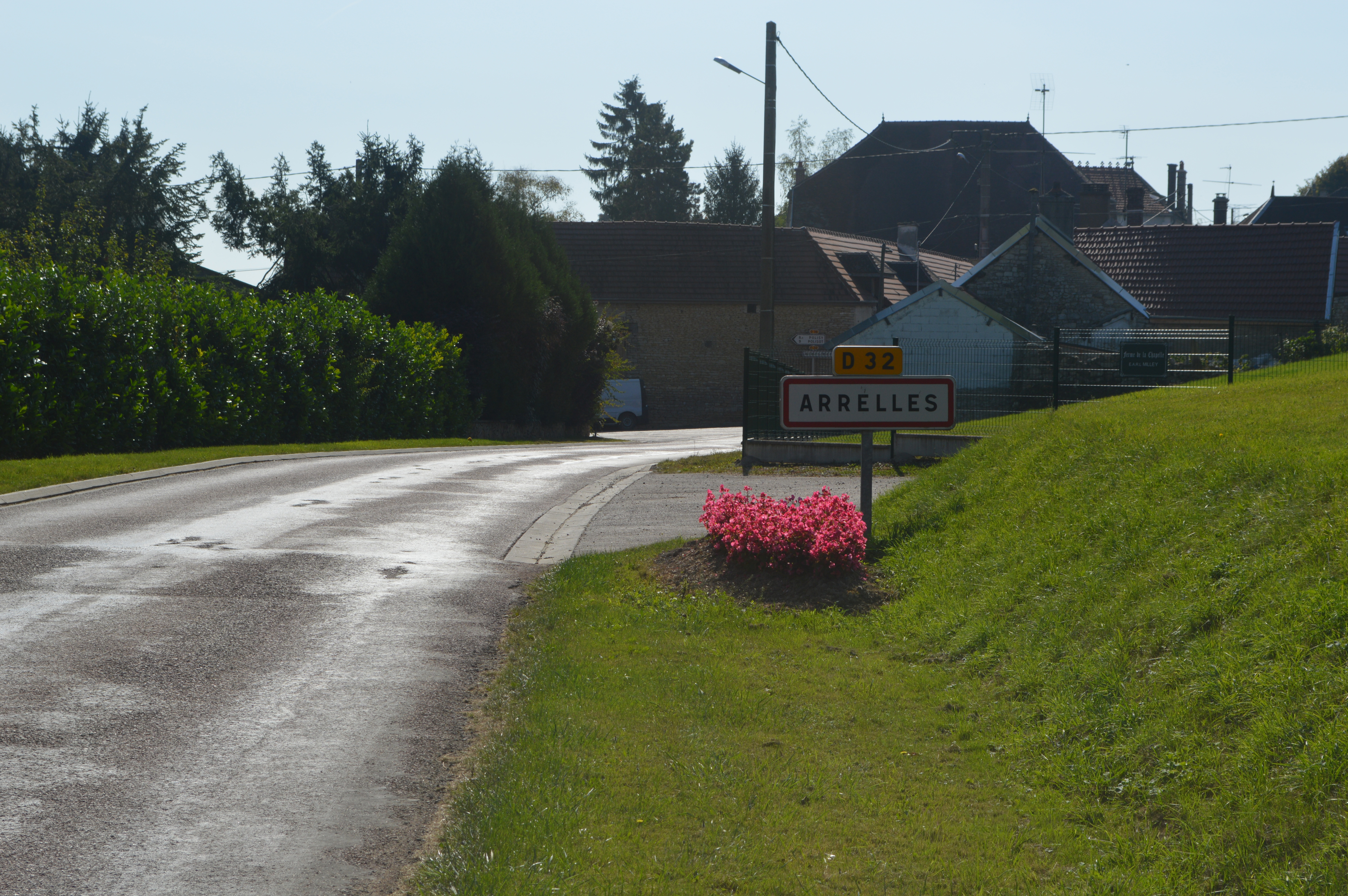
- The road into Arrelles
- Location of Arrelles
- Location within France Location within Grand Est
- Coordinates: 48°03′02″N 4°16′36″E
- Country: France
- Region: Grand Est
- Department: Aube
- Arrondissement: Troyes
- Canton: Les Riceys
- Intercommunality: Barséquanais en Champagne

Government
  - Mayor (2020–2026): Robert Guillemin
- Area^{1}: 14.36 km^{2} (5.54 sq mi)
- Elevation: 190 m (620 ft)
- Population (2023): 90
  - Density: 6.3/km^{2} (16/sq mi)
- Time zone: UTC+01:00 (CET)
  - Summer (DST): UTC+02:00 (CEST)
- INSEE/Postal code: 10009 /10340
- ^{1} French Land Register data, which excludes lakes, ponds, glaciers > 1 km^{2} (0.386 sq mi or 247 acres) and river estuaries.

Arrelles (French pronunciation: [aʁɛl]) is a commune in the Aube department in the Grand Est region of northern-central France.

== Geography ==
Arrelles is located some 25 km south-east of Troyes and 15 km east of Chaource. Access to the commune is by the D36 road from Lantages in the north-west passing through the village and continuing east to Polisy. There is also the D32 road from the village to Avirey-Lingey in the south and the D84 from the village south-west to Balnot-la-Grange. East of the village is heavily forested and there are also forests in the south-west with the rest of the commune farmland.

The Sarce river flows through the centre of the commune and the village from south to north then north-east forming the border of the commune and continuing north to join the Seine at Virey-sous-Bar.

== Administration ==
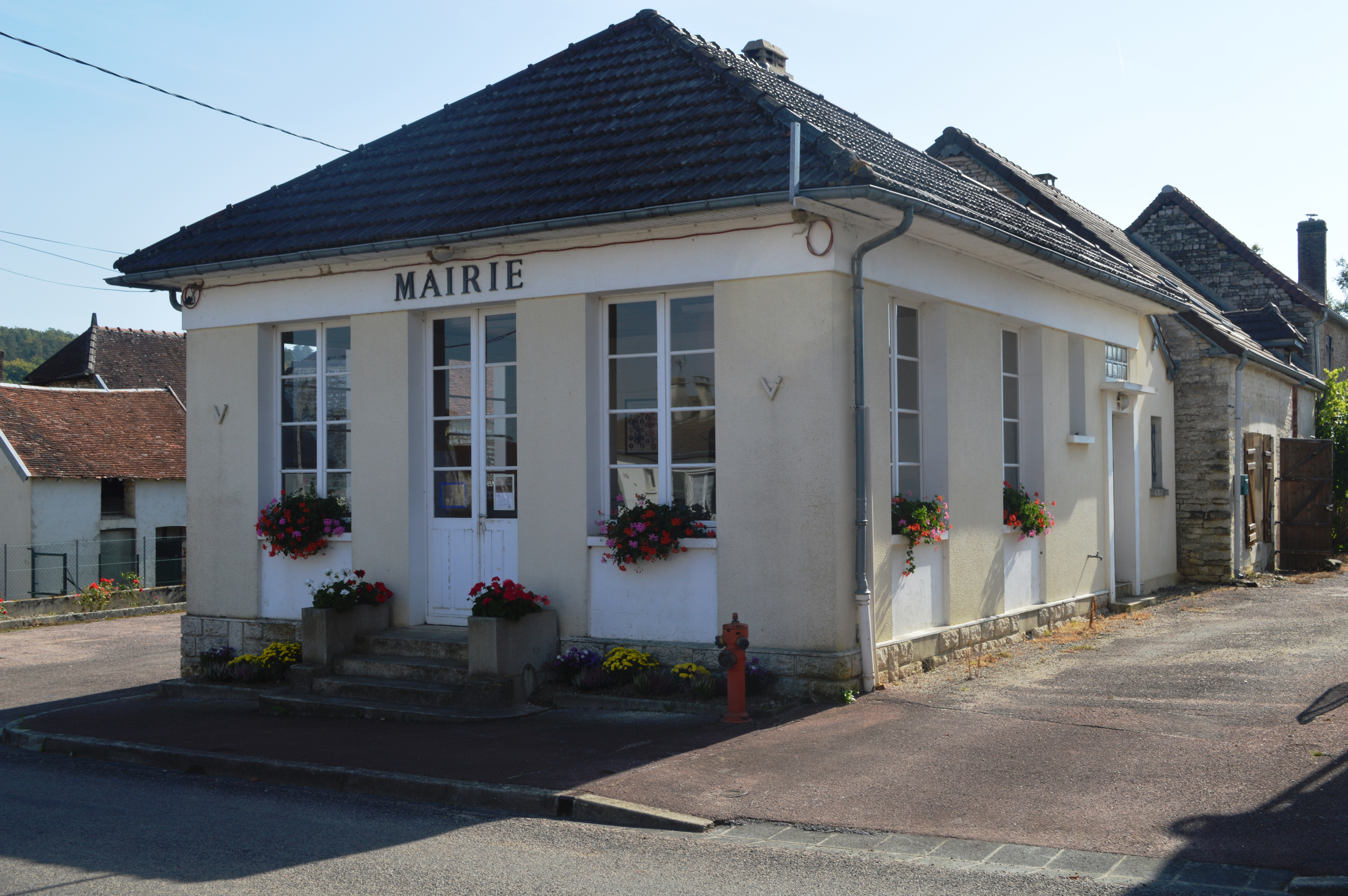
The Town Hall

List of Successive Mayors

From	To	Name	Party
	1857	Brunet	
2001	2008	Jacques Dechannes	
2008		Robert Guillemin	DVD
2014	2020	Séverine Chassain	
2020	2026	Robert Guillemin	DVD
2026	Incumbent	Gerard Corbin	

== Population ==
The inhabitants of the commune are known as Arrellois or Arrelloises in French.

Historical population
Year	Pop.	±% p.a.
1968	103	—
1975	119	+2.08%
1982	92	−3.61%
1990	85	−0.98%
1999	73	−1.68%
2007	82	+1.46%
2012	87	+1.19%
2017	86	−0.23%
2023	90	+0.76%
Source: INSEE

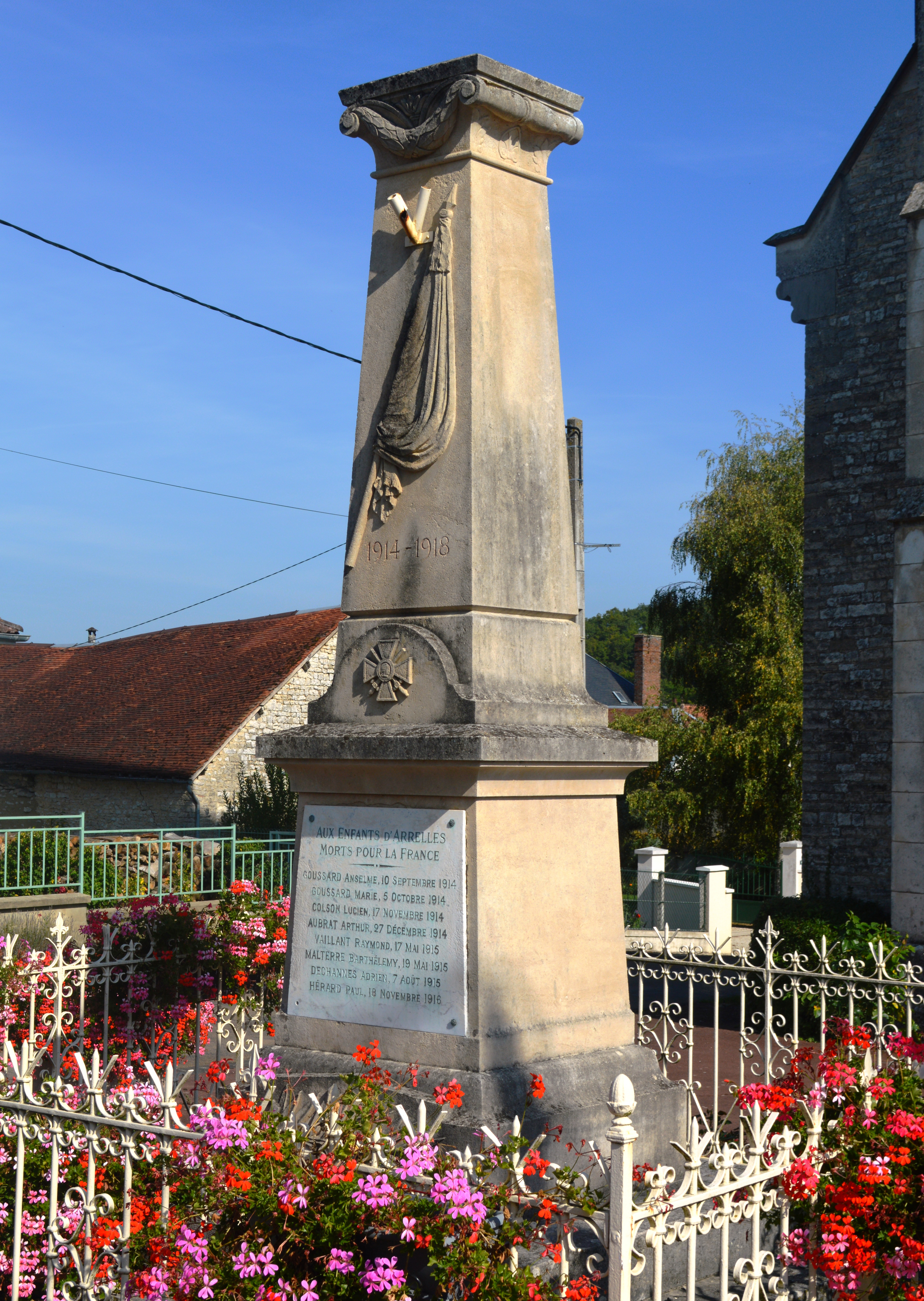
Arrelles War Memorial

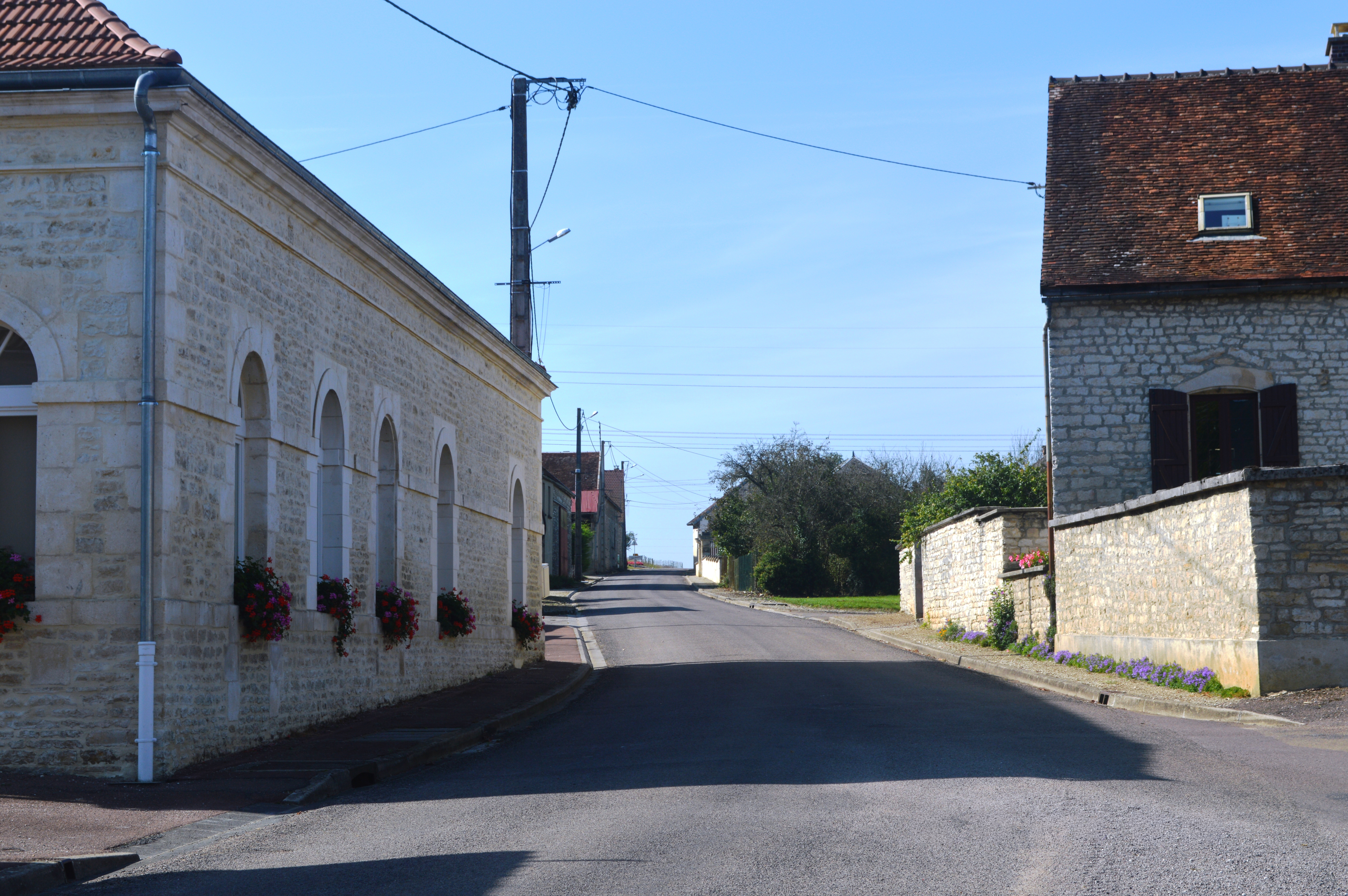
A street in Arrelles

== Sites and monuments ==
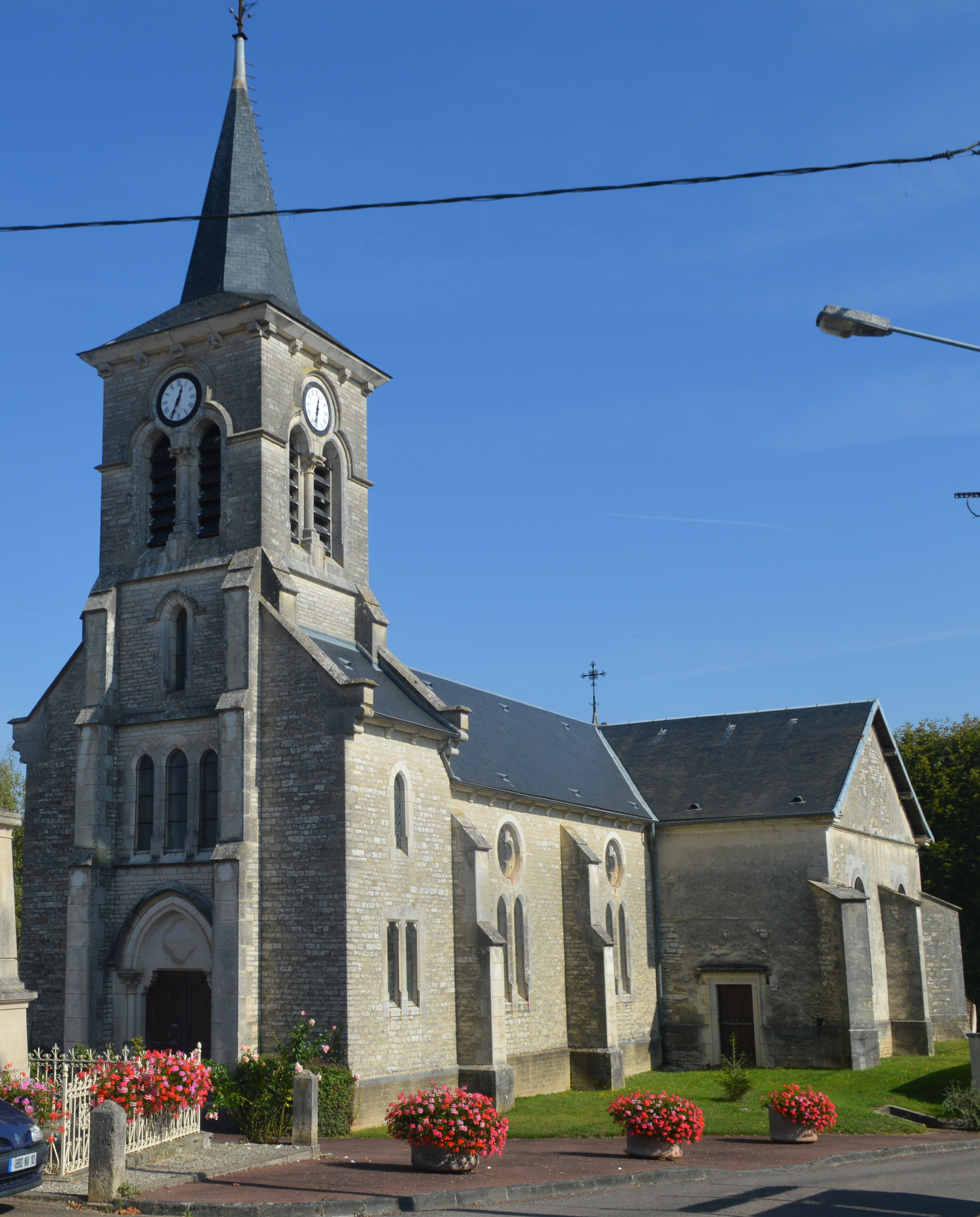
The Church of Saint-Pierre-ès-Liens

The Church of Saint-Pierre-ès-Liens was rebuilt in 1825 based on a plan with a square choir from the 12th century and a double transept from the 16th century. The nave and bell tower porch are from the 19th century. There are many items in the church which are registered as historical objects:

- Statue of San Sebastian (16th century)
- Statue of Saint Peter (19th century)
- A processional staff (19th century)
- Statue of Saint Évêque (15th century)
- Statue of Sainte Marguerite (16th century)
- Louis XVI Chair (18th century)
- Statue of Saint Robert (16th century)
- Statue of Saint Yves between two litigants (16th century)
- Altar and Retable on the north side (19th century)
- Altar and Retable on the south side (19th century)
- Sculpture of Christ on the Cross (16th-17th century)
- Statue of the Immaculate Conception (19th century)
- Paten (19th century)
- Liturgical book: Psalter (17th century)
- 2 Reliquaries (19th century)
- Processional staff of the Brotherhood of the Sacred Heart (18th century)
- Ciborium (19th century)
- Chalice (19th century)
- Monstrance (19th century)
- Statuette: Education of the Virgin (18th century)
- Pulpit (19th century)
- Holy water font (17th century)
- Baptismal font (15th century)
- Main Altar, display, tabernacle, reliquaries (19th century)
- Sculpture: Education of the Virgin (16th century)
- Painting: Saint Peter delivered by an angel (19th century)
- Painting: Immaculate conception (19th century)

== See also ==
- Communes of the Aube department

=== External links ===
- Arrelles on the National Geographic Institute website (in French)
- Arrelles on Géoportail, National Geographic Institute (IGN) website (in French)
- Arelles on the 1750 Cassini Map
