= Avirey-Lingey =

Commune in Grand Est, France

- Commune
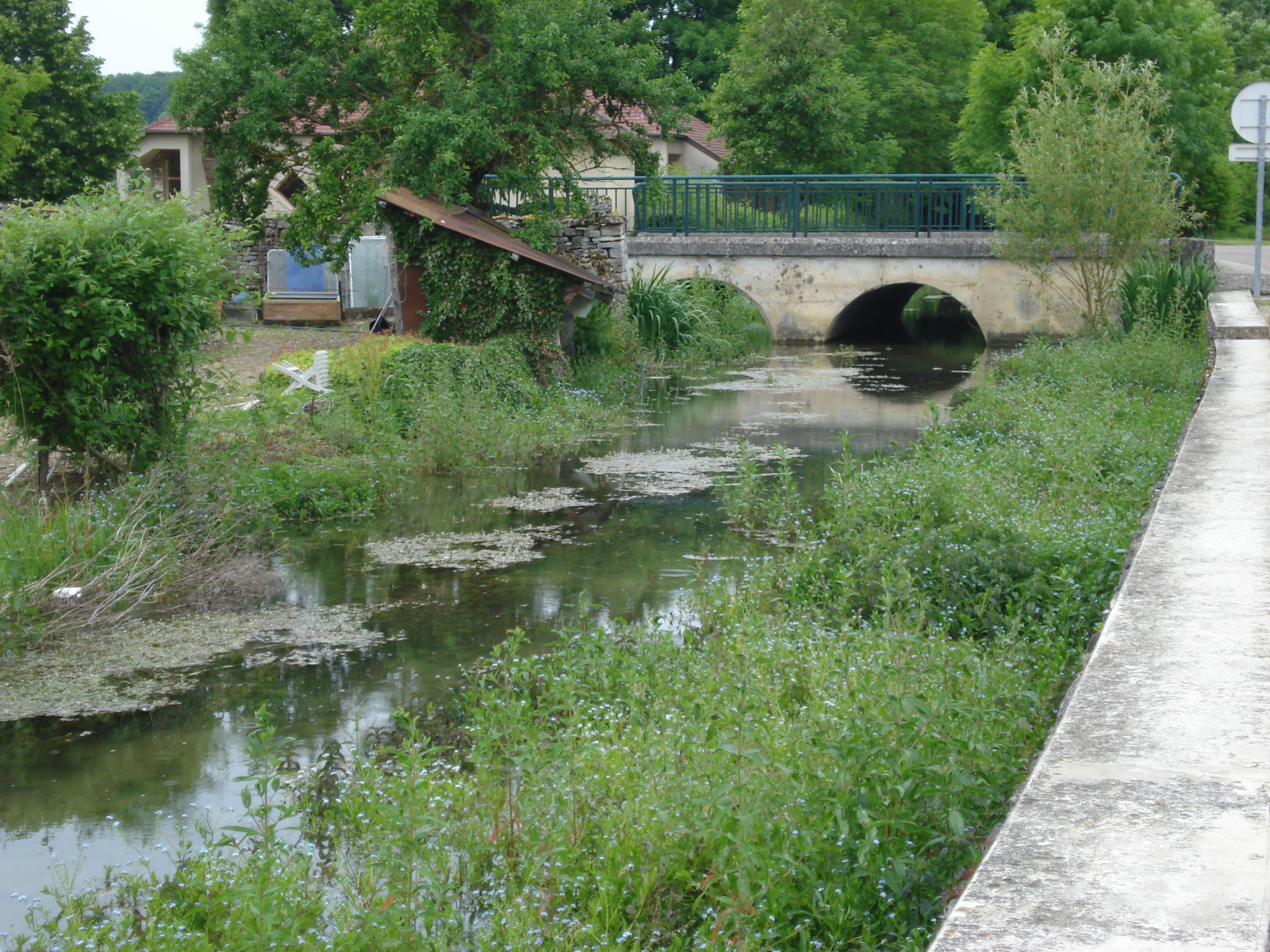
- The bridge over the Sarce in Avirey-Lingey
- Location of Avirey-Lingey
- Location within France Location within Grand Est
- Coordinates: 48°01′35″N 4°18′03″E
- Country: France
- Region: Grand Est
- Department: Aube
- Arrondissement: Troyes
- Canton: Les Riceys
- Intercommunality: CC Barséquanais Champagne

Government
  - Mayor (2020–2026): Magali Rebours
- Area^{1}: 17.85 km^{2} (6.89 sq mi)
- Elevation: 200 m (660 ft)
- Population (2023): 196
  - Density: 11.0/km^{2} (28.4/sq mi)
- Time zone: UTC+01:00 (CET)
  - Summer (DST): UTC+02:00 (CEST)
- INSEE/Postal code: 10022 /10340
- ^{1} French Land Register data, which excludes lakes, ponds, glaciers > 1 km^{2} (0.386 sq mi or 247 acres) and river estuaries.

Avirey-Lingey (French pronunciation: [aviʁɛ lɛ̃ʒɛ]) is a commune in the Aube department in the Grand Est region of north-central France.

== Geography ==
Avirey-Lingey is located some 35 km south-east of Troyes and 40 km east of Saint-Florentin. Access to the commune is by the D32 road from Arrelles in the north which passes through the commune and the village and continues south to Bagneux-la-Fosse. The D142 goes west from the village to join the D3 south-west of Chaource. The D184 goes north-east from the village to join the D36 west of Polisy. The village of Lingey is to the north-west of the main village. The commune is mixed forest and farmland.

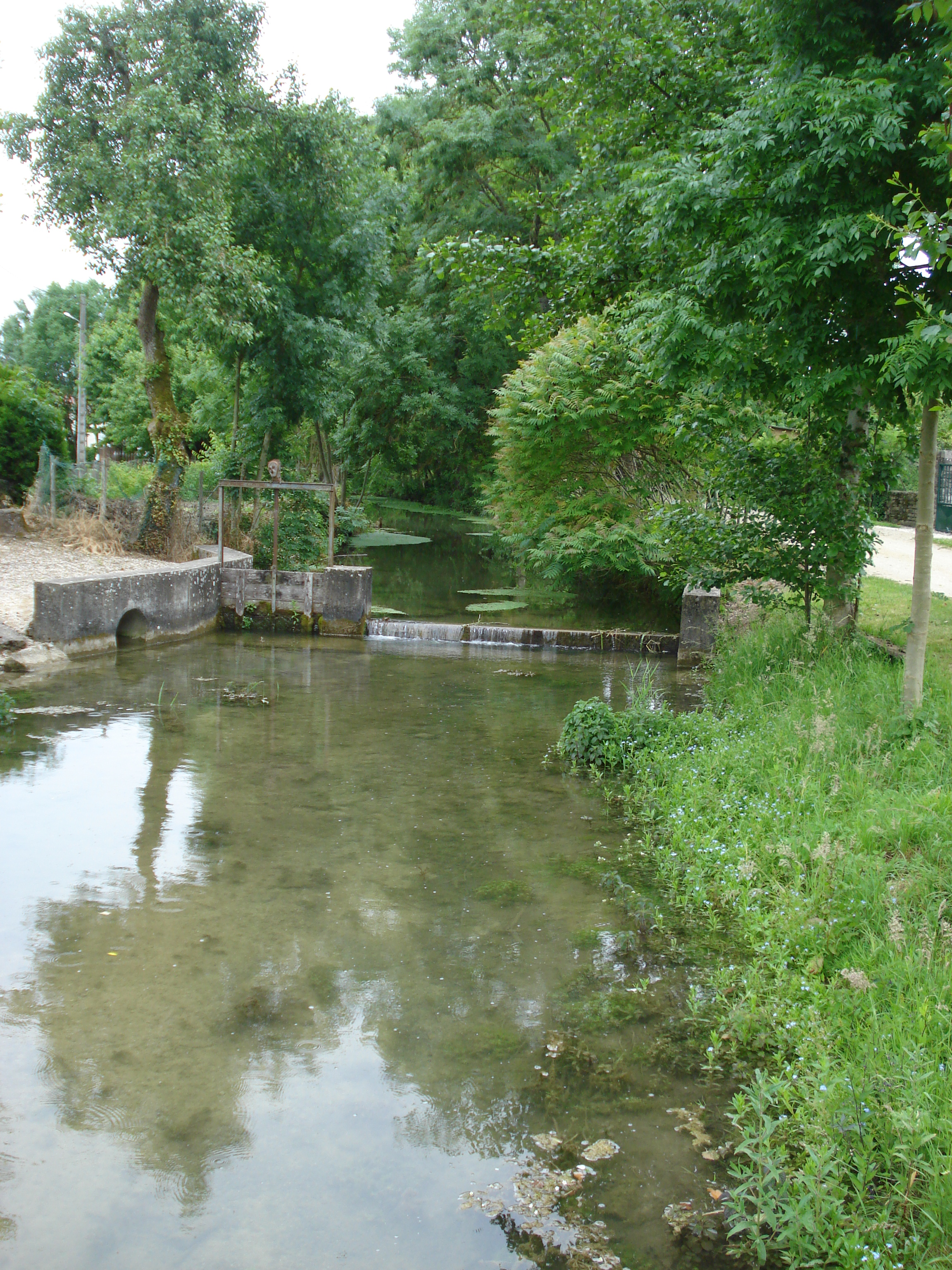
The Sarce.

The Sarce river flows through the centre of the commune from south-east to north-west where it continues north to join the Seine at Virey-sous-Bar.

== Toponymy ==
The name Avirey comes from a Roman man's name Avirius

Older versions have been attested: Avireium in 1081, Avirey in 1793, and Avirey-Luigé in 1801.

== History ==
Avirey-Lingey was created through the merger of two parishes, Avirey and Lingey, after the French Revolution. A legend tells of a patron saint named Saint Phal who lived in the commune during the 6th century and is registered in the Roman Martyrology. He promoted the fertility of women.

Its vineyard was appreciated by King Henri IV who invited his minister, Maximilien de Béthune, Duke of Sully, to come and drink a glass of his "good wine from Avirey".

During the 17th century there were only few people in the area due to epidemics and famine.

In 1872, Avirey-Lingey consisted of four holiday inns, five grocers, a mill, and a traditional oil mill.

Since 2004 the municipality has launched several major projects related to the conservation and preservation of local heritage, in particular its two main buildings: the church and the town hall. The church was closed in 2004 and a notice of unfitness signed in 2006.

In January 2013, the Mayor announced the development of a socio-cultural hall and the repair of the roof of the Town Hall.

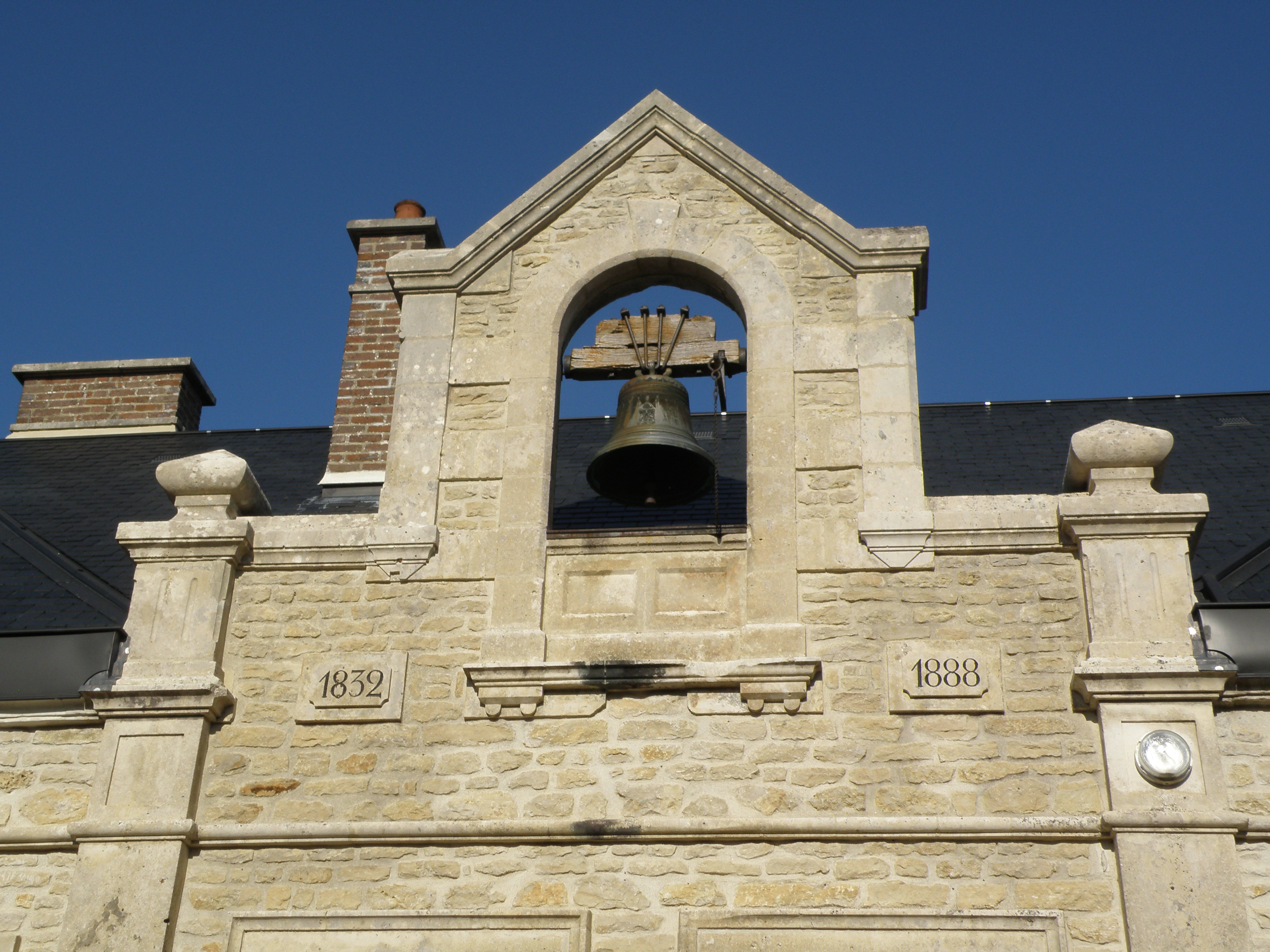
The bell on the Town Hall

The roof of the Town Hall, which has the distinction of having a bell, was completed in 2013. Restoration work for the Church of Saint-Phal began in 2009 and continued in 2013.

== Administration ==
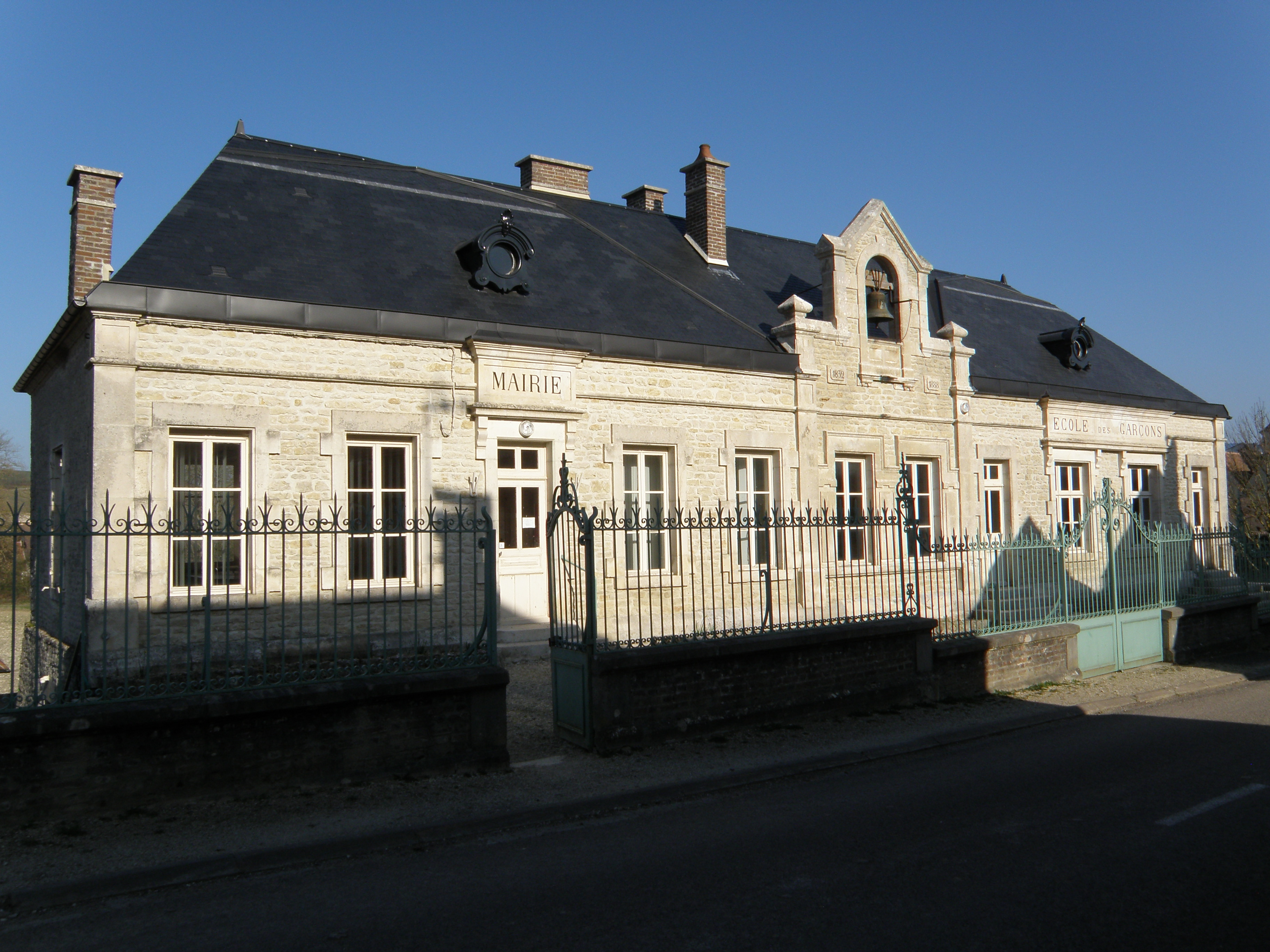
The Town Hall/School

As the population of the commune is between 100 and 500, the number of members of the municipal council is 11.

List of Successive Mayors

From	To	Name
	1857	Aubry
2001	2008	Serge Mathieu
2008	2026	Magali Rebours

== Demography ==
Historical population

Year	Pop.	±% p.a.
1793	588	—
1821	830	+1.24%
1846	760	−0.35%
1872	676	−0.45%
1901	560	−0.65%
1926	384	−1.50%
1946	326	−0.82%
1962	282	−0.90%
1968	260	−1.34%

Year	Pop.	±% p.a.
1975	212	−2.87%
1982	225	+0.85%
1990	198	−1.59%
1999	210	+0.66%
2007	222	+0.70%
2012	218	−0.36%
2017	206	−1.13%
2023	196	−0.83%

Source: EHESS and INSEE

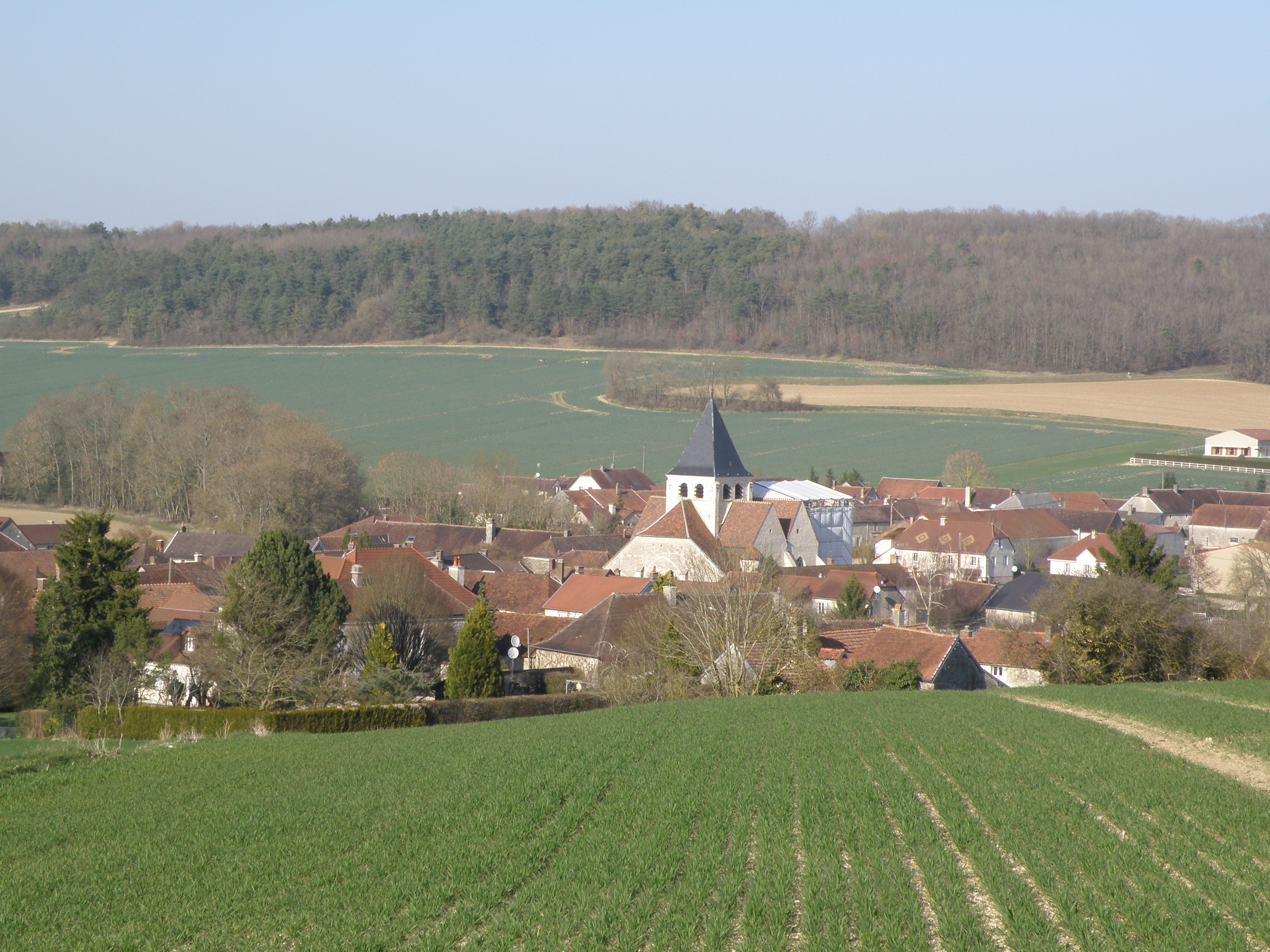
General View of Avirey-Lingey

=== Education ===
Avirey-Lingey is located in the Academy of Reims.

The commune does not administer any preschool or elementary school.

=== Cultural events and festivities ===
The commune participates in the theatre festival "From one scene to another" using its multipurpose hall. The third festival was held in 2013.

The "Road of Champagne Festival" is a major event that lasts two days and took place in Avirey-Lingey in 2008. The attendance record then was broken with over 30,000 visitors.

=== Health ===
There is no doctor or nurse in Avirey-Lingey. The nearest are located in Riceys.

=== Media ===
The regional daily L'Est-Éclair publication provides local information on the commune.

The commune has no ADSL node connection ADSL installed, nor is it connected to a fibre optic network. Telephone lines are connected to an exchange located in Bagneux-la-Fosse.

=== Worship ===
Only Catholic worship is available in Avirey-Lingey. The town is one of the seven communes grouped in the parish of "Riceys" which is one of the nine parishes in the pastoral area of "Côtes des Bar" in the diocese of Troyes. The place of worship is the parish church of Saint-Phal.

== Economy ==
In 2017, the active population amounted to 113 people, including 10 unemployed. These workers are in majority employees (67%), and are in majority employed outside the commune (59%).

On 31 December 2015 there were 41 businesses in Avirey-Lingey: 31 in agriculture-forestry-fishing, one in industry, 6 in various trade-transport-services, and 3 were related to the public sector. The total number of paid jobs was 42, 74% of which in agriculture.

Avirey-Lingey has been in the appellation d'origine contrôlée (AOC) zone for Chaource cheese since 1970 and has had a protected designation of origin (PDO) (European equivalent) since 1996.

== Culture and heritage ==
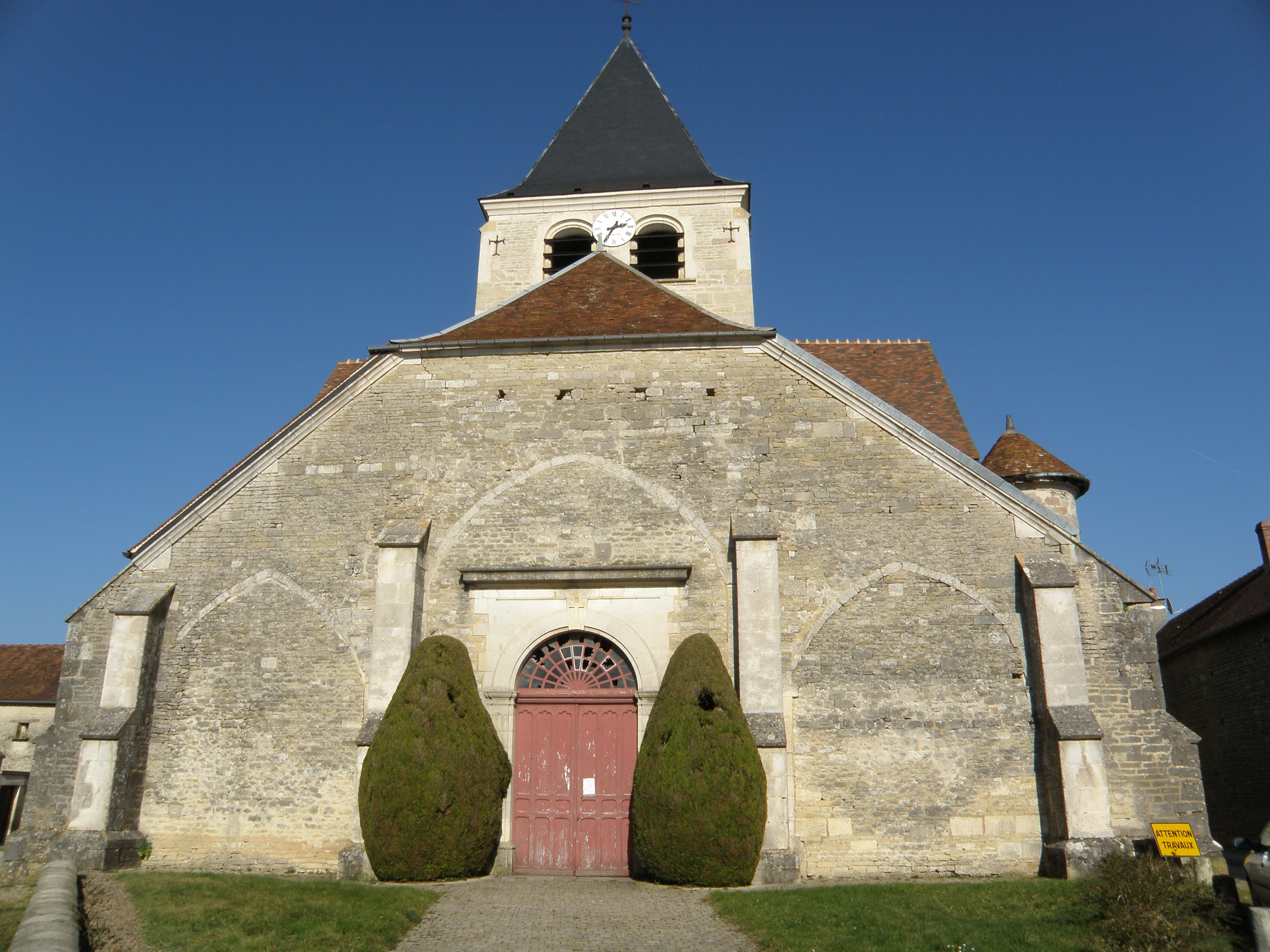
The Church of Saint-Phal

=== Religious heritage ===
The commune has one religious building that is registered as an historical monument:

The Church of Saint Phal (16th century). The church was rebuilt in the first half of the 16th century and completed in the 19th century. Before the French Revolution it was in the diocese of Langres. The Church contains many items that are registered as historical objects:

- Windows (16th century)
- Main Altar and Retable (19th century)
- A Processional friary staff: Saint Vincent (19th century)
- A Chasuble (19th century)
- A Chasuble and Stole (19th century)
- A Pail for Holy water (19th century)
- A Painting: Baptism of Christ (18th century)
- A Group Sculpture (16th century)
- A Group Sculpture: Two men (16th century)
- A Group Sculpture: two people sitting (16th century)
- A Group Sculpture: Creche (16th century)
- A Painting: Wayside Cross (19th century)
- A Processional friary staff: Saint Sacrement (18th century)
- A Processional friary staff: Saint Bishop (18th century)
- An Eagle Lectern (18th century)
- A Processional friary staff: Virgin (18th century)
- A Reliquary of Saint Fidolus (18th century)
Views of the exterior of the Church of Saint-Phal.

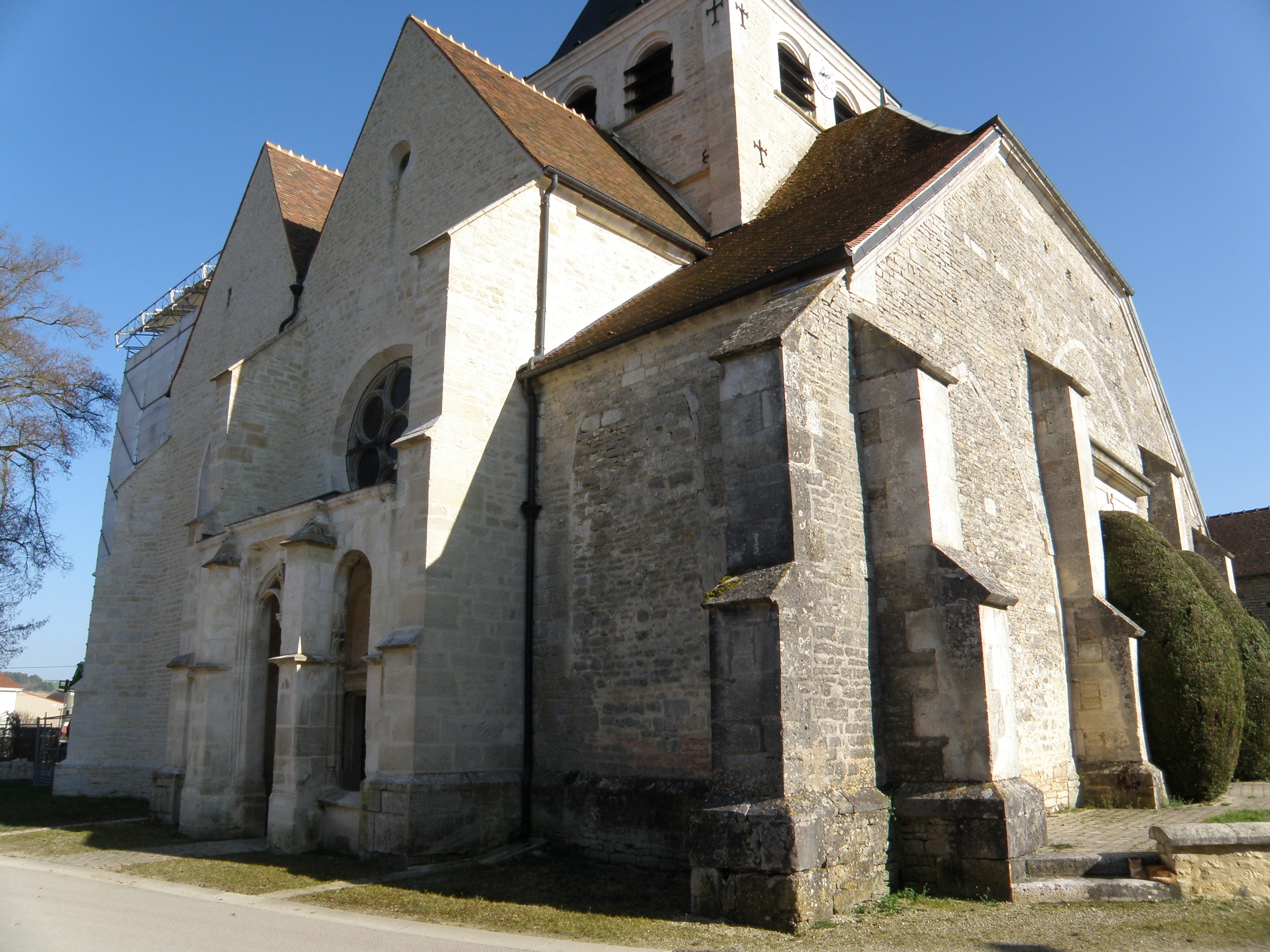

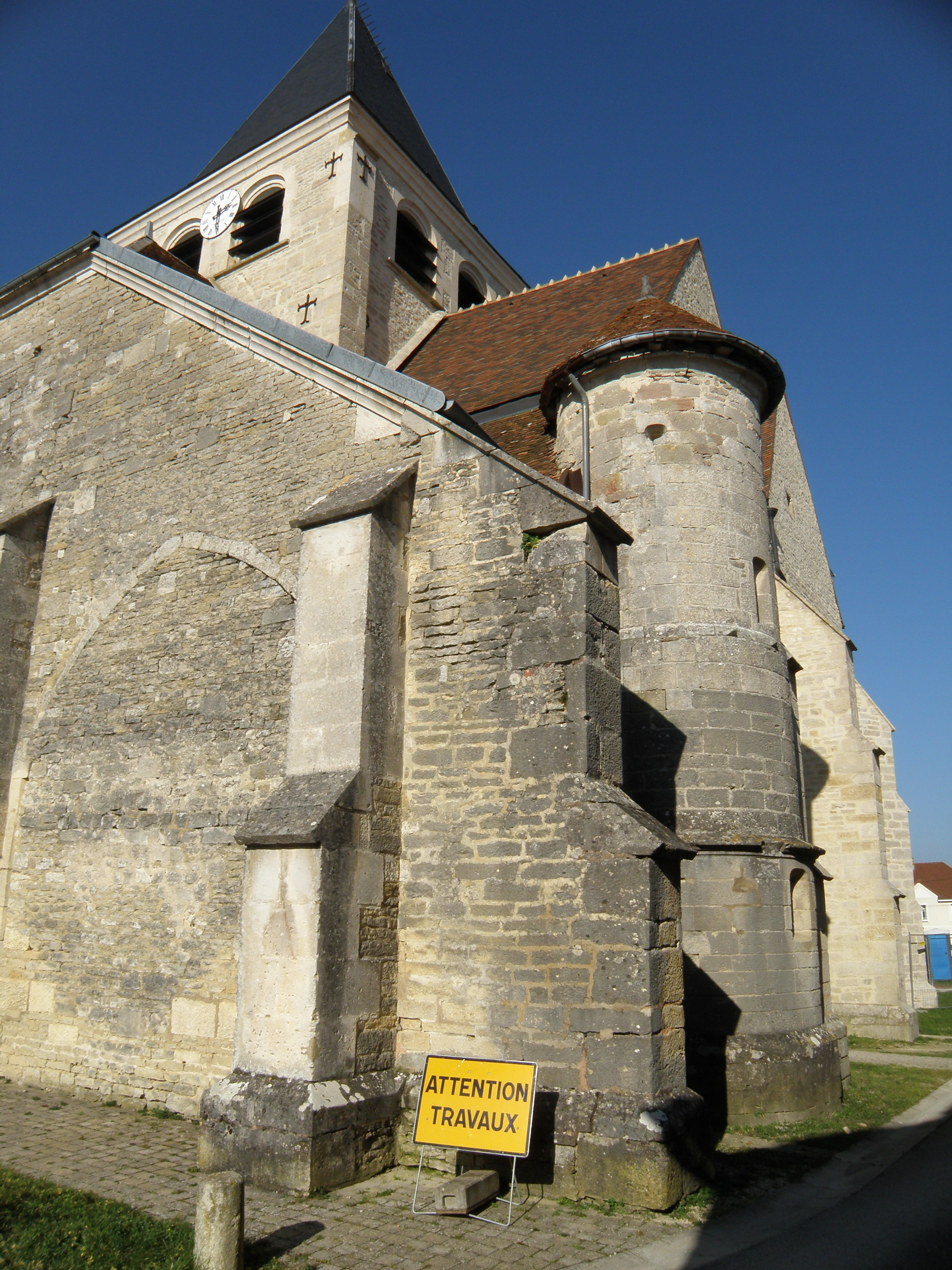

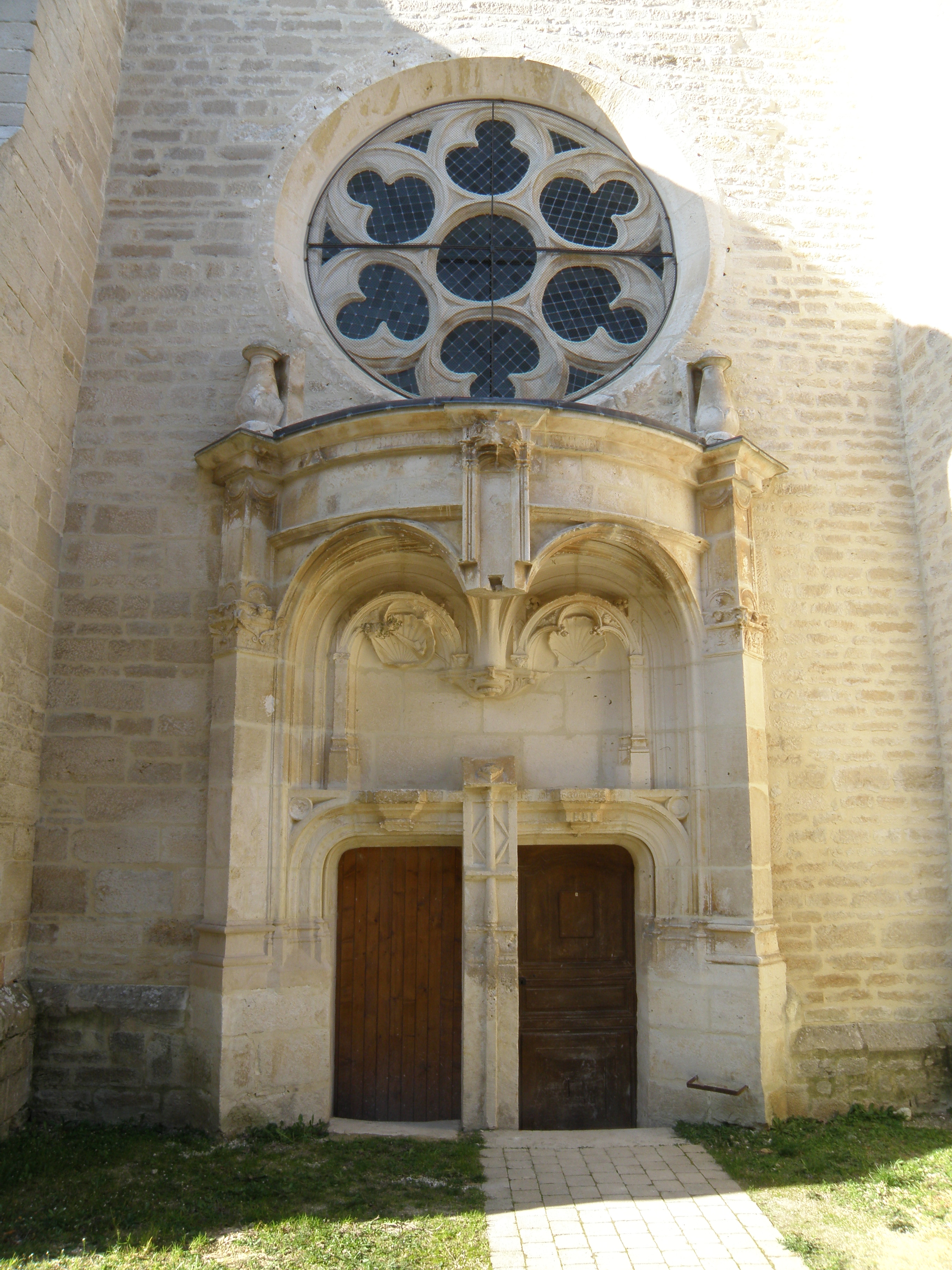

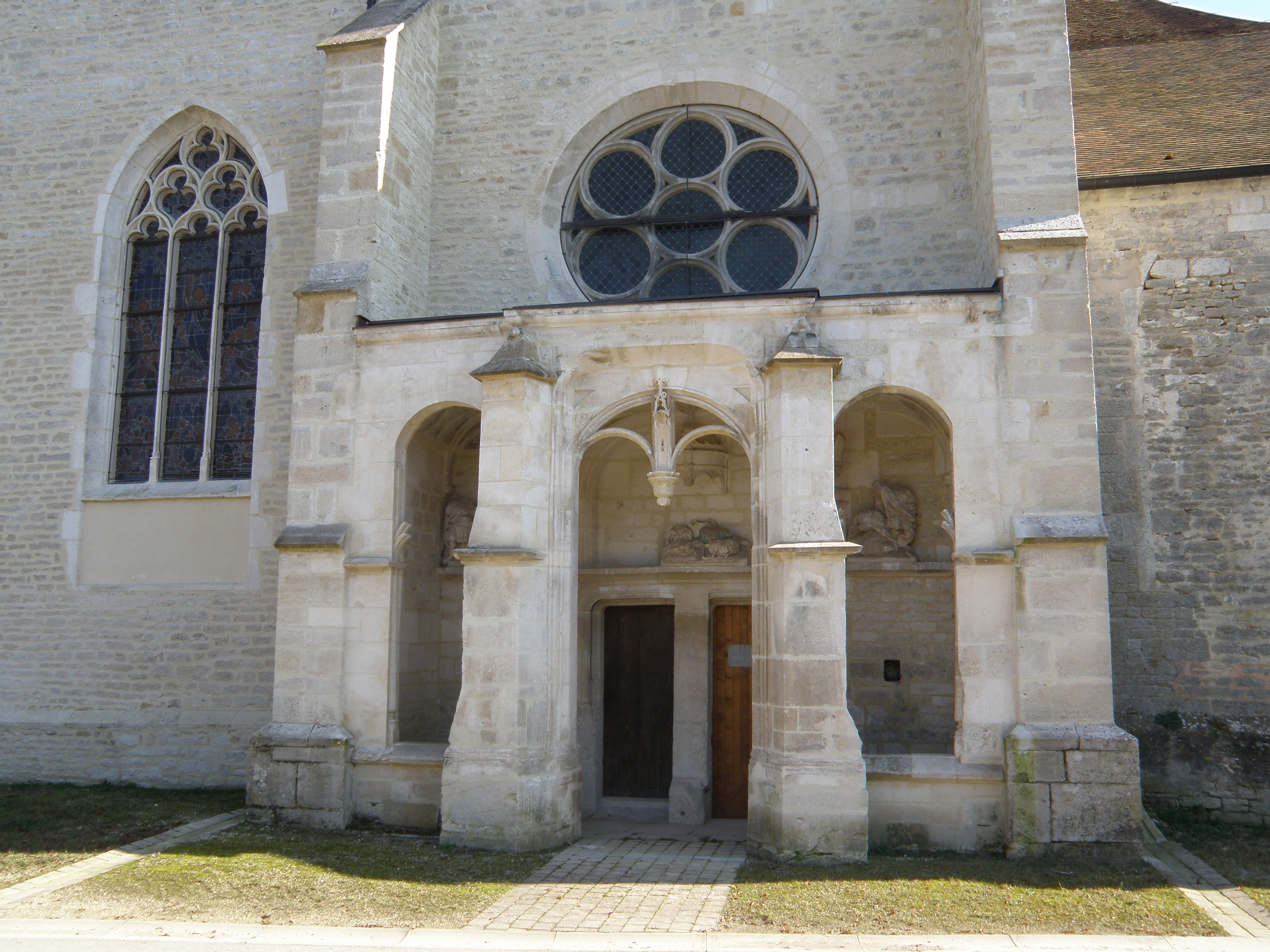

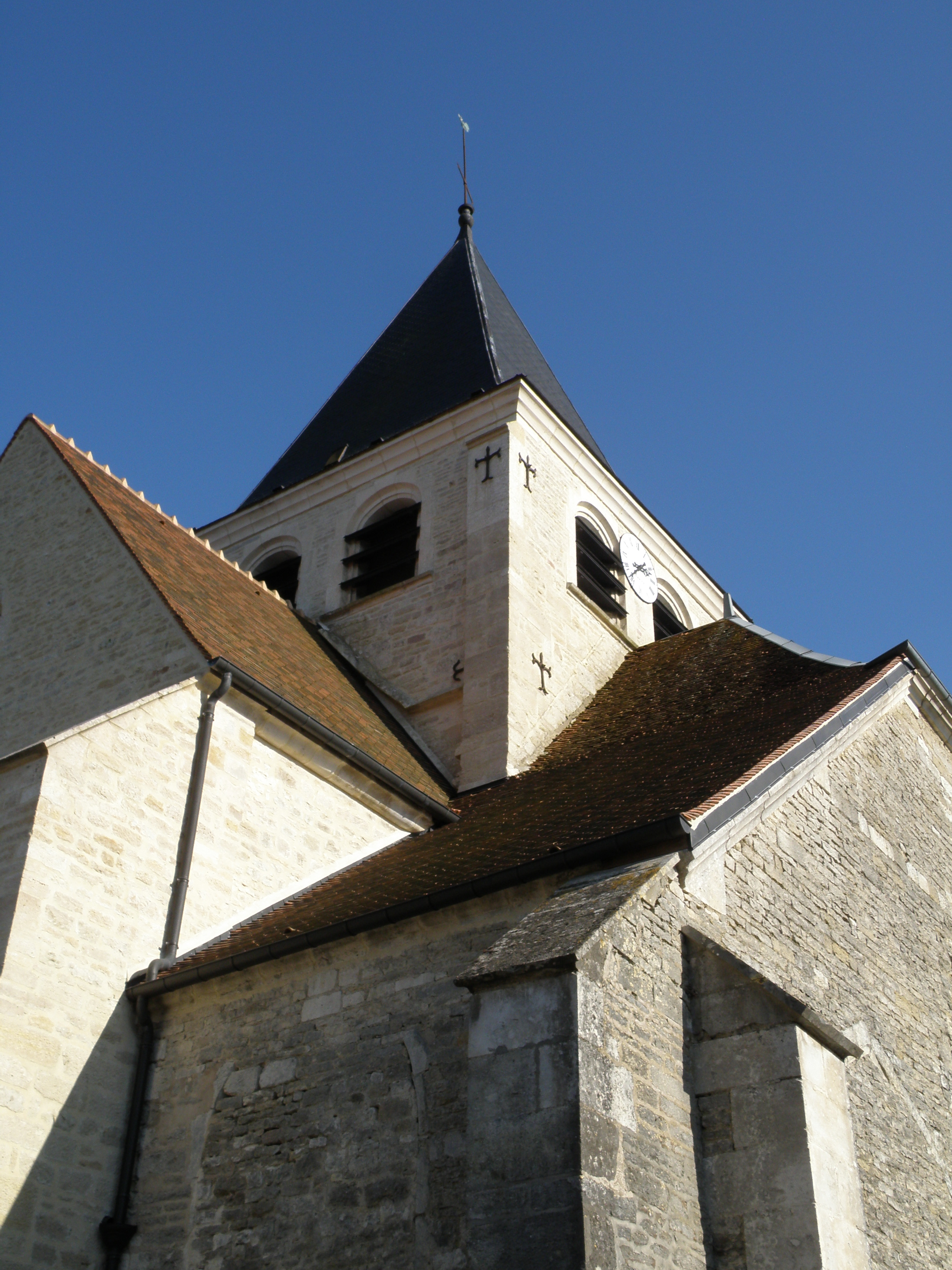

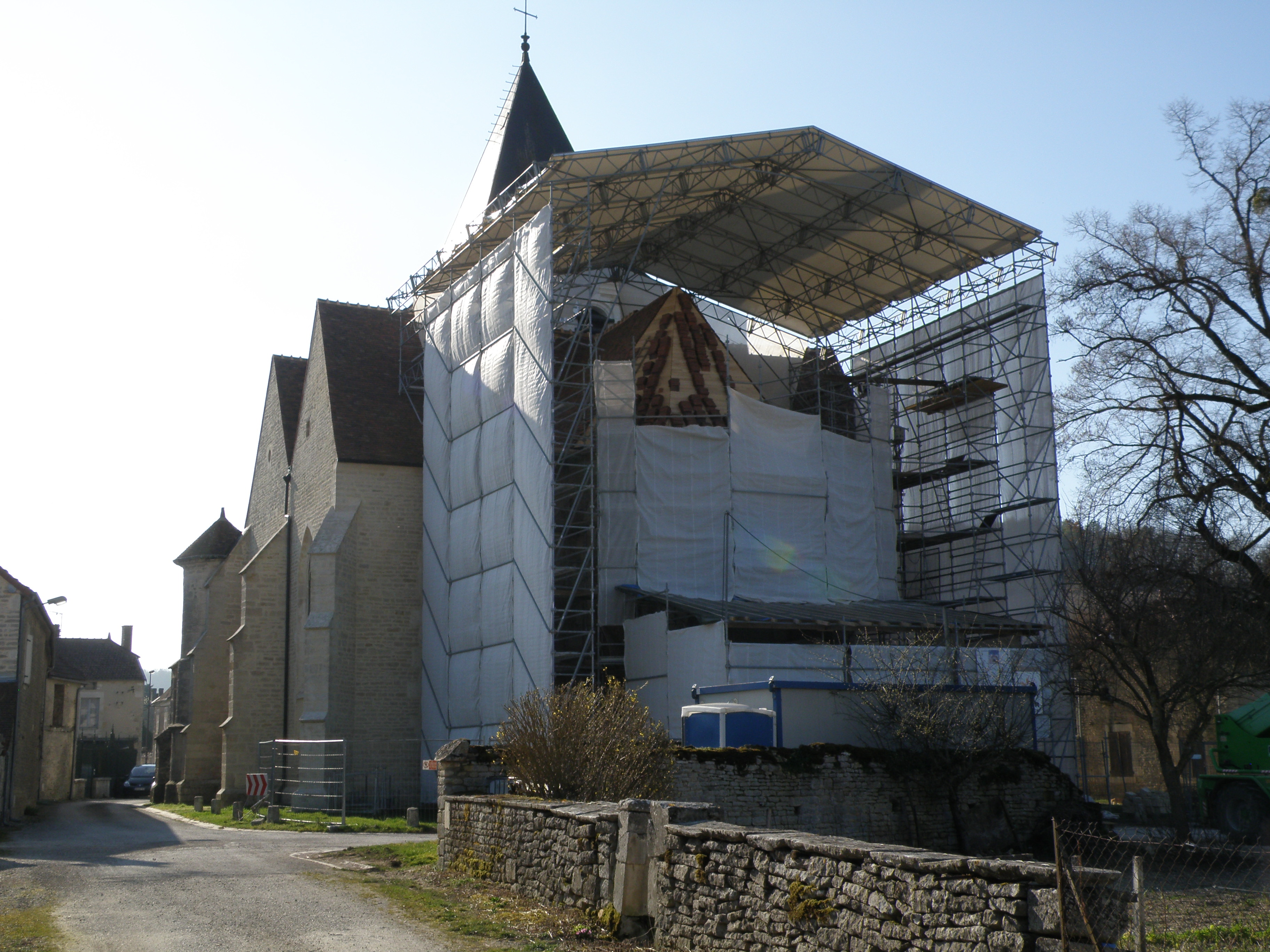

Other sites of interest

The Chapel of Saint-Genevieve at Lingey with a Romanesque nave and choir from the 16th century. The chapel was destroyed by fire in 1722 and the repairs from 1726 to 1760 distorted the structure. The Chapel contains a number of items that are registered as historical objects:

- An Altar and Retable, Tabernacle (18th century)
- A liturgical book: Ritual (1658)
- An Ampoule of Holy Oil (19th century)
- An Ampoule of Holy Oil (19th century)
- A Cabinet-tabernacle-chest in the sacristy (19th century)
- A Group Sculpture: Education of the Virgin (17th century)
- A Statue: Saint Genevieve (17th century)
- A Tabernacle: Carrying of the Cross (19th century)
- 22 rows of Seating (18th century)
- The Choir enclosure: communion table (disappeared) (18th century)
- A Processional friary staff: Saint Genevieve (19th century)
- A Statue: Saint Genevieve (18th century)

== See also ==
- Communes of the Aube department

=== Bibliography ===
- Daniel Delattre, Emmanuel Delattre, Nathalie Delattre-Arnould, Odette Delattre, and Laëtitia Delattre-Rigaux: Aube, the 433 communes, Éditions Delattre, 2005, reprint 2013, 240 pages, ISBN 978-2-36464-035-1, N.B.: this book has a chapter on each commune in the department of Aube (in French)
- Laurent Denajar, "Aube", Vol 10 of Archaeological Map of Gaul, Les Éditions de la MSH, 2005, ISBN 978-2-87754-093-3, Chapter on Arrentières (in French)
