= Bagneux-la-Fosse =

Commune in Grand Est, France

- Commune
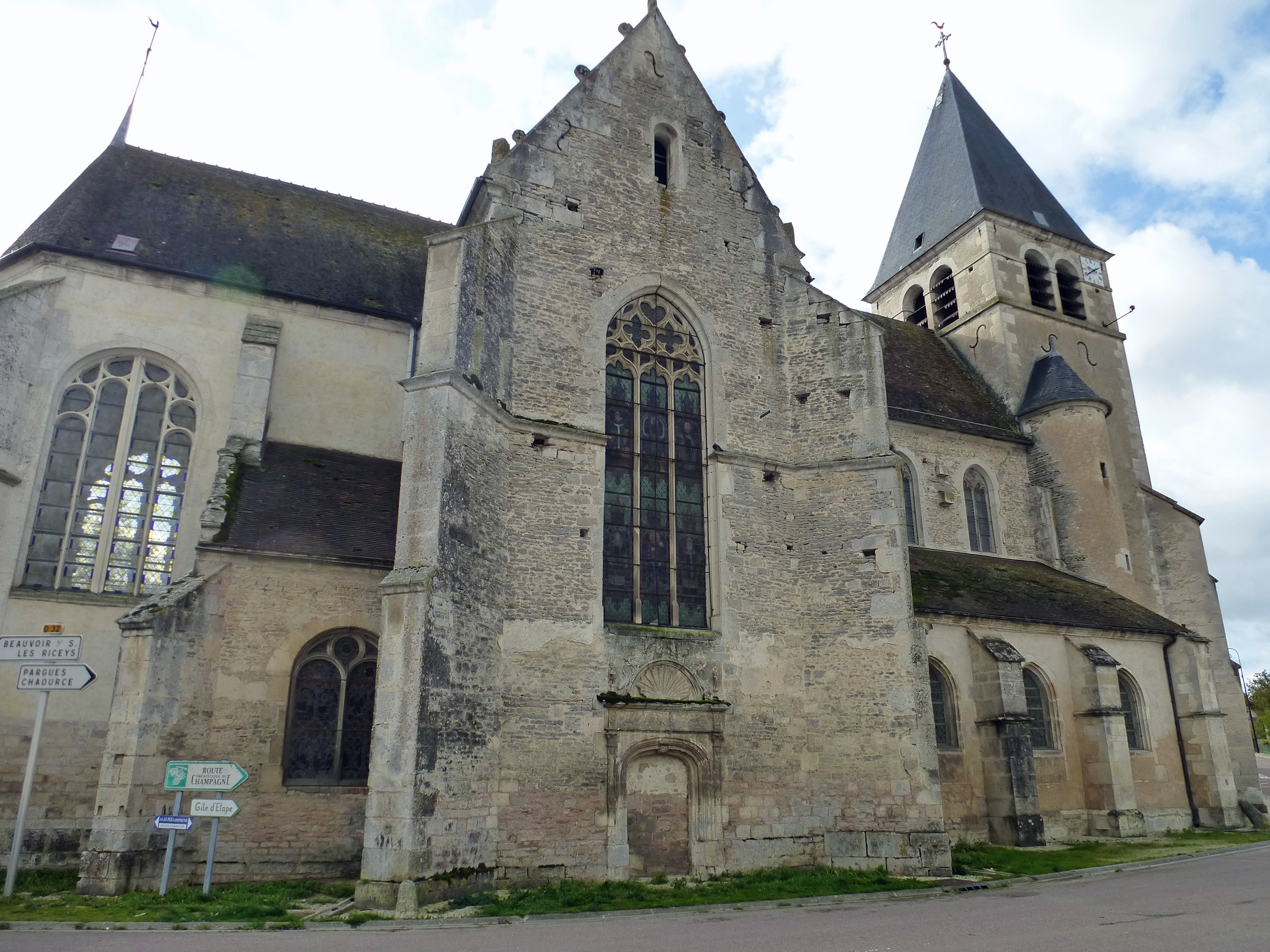
- The Church

- Coat of arms
- Location of Bagneux-la-Fosse
- Location within France Location within Grand Est
- Coordinates: 47°59′36″N 4°17′55″E
- Country: France
- Region: Grand Est
- Department: Aube
- Arrondissement: Troyes
- Canton: Les Riceys

Government
  - Mayor (2020–2026): Éric Glorieux
- Area^{1}: 22.93 km^{2} (8.85 sq mi)
- Elevation: 225 m (738 ft)
- Population (2023): 178
  - Density: 7.76/km^{2} (20.1/sq mi)
- Time zone: UTC+01:00 (CET)
  - Summer (DST): UTC+02:00 (CEST)
- INSEE/Postal code: 10025 /10340
- ^{1} French Land Register data, which excludes lakes, ponds, glaciers > 1 km^{2} (0.386 sq mi or 247 acres) and river estuaries.

Bagneux-la-Fosse (French pronunciation: [baɲø la fos]) is a commune in the Aube department in the Grand Est region of north-central France.

== Geography ==
Bagneux-la-Fosse is located some 40 km east of Saint-Florentin and 15 km south-west of Bar-sur-Seine. Access to the commune is by the D32 road from Avirey-Lingey in the north which passes through the village before continuing south to join the D452 which continues to Channes. The D17 goes west from the village the north-west to Pargues. The D26 branches off the D32 north-east of the village and goes north-east to Neuville-sur-Seine. There is a large forest in the north-west of the commune and a smaller forest in the south-east with the rest of the commune farmland.

The Sarce river flows through the commune from south to north just east of the village and continues north to join the Seine at Virey-sous-Bar.

== Administration ==
List of Successive Mayors

From	To	Name
	1857	Merey
2001	2008	Marie-Paule Dupin
2008	2020	Francis Carre
2020	2026	Éric Glorieux

== Demography ==
The inhabitants of the commune are known as Bagnolais or Bagnolaises in French.

Historical population

Year	Pop.	±% p.a.
1793	695	—
1821	798	+0.49%
1846	760	−0.19%
1872	673	−0.47%
1901	507	−0.97%
1926	361	−1.35%
1946	343	−0.26%
1962	274	−1.39%
1968	241	−2.12%

Year	Pop.	±% p.a.
1975	283	+2.32%
1982	239	−2.39%
1990	217	−1.20%
1999	199	−0.96%
2007	180	−1.25%
2012	172	−0.91%
2017	168	−0.47%
2023	178	+0.97%

Source: EHESS and INSEE

== Sites and monuments ==
The Church (15th century) is registered as an historical monument. The church contains many items that are registered as historical objects:

- A Pulpit (18th century)
- A Tombstone (17th century)
- The Tombstone of François Merey (18th century)
- The Tombstone of Marie Viviane Leclerc (18th century)
- The Tombstone of Nicolas Babeau (1696)
- The lateral Altars (19th century)
- 2 Reliquaries (19th century)
- A Monstrance (19th century)
- A Processional Banner: Saint Valentine (19th century)
- A Chasuble (19th century)
- A Painting: Way of the Cross (19th century)
- A Commemorative Plaque (1533)
- An Eagle Lectern (19th century)
- A Statuette on a Processional Staff: Virgin and child (disappeared) (18th century)
- The Furniture in the Church

== See also ==
- Communes of the Aube department
