= Virey-sous-Bar =

Commune in Grand Est, France

- Commune
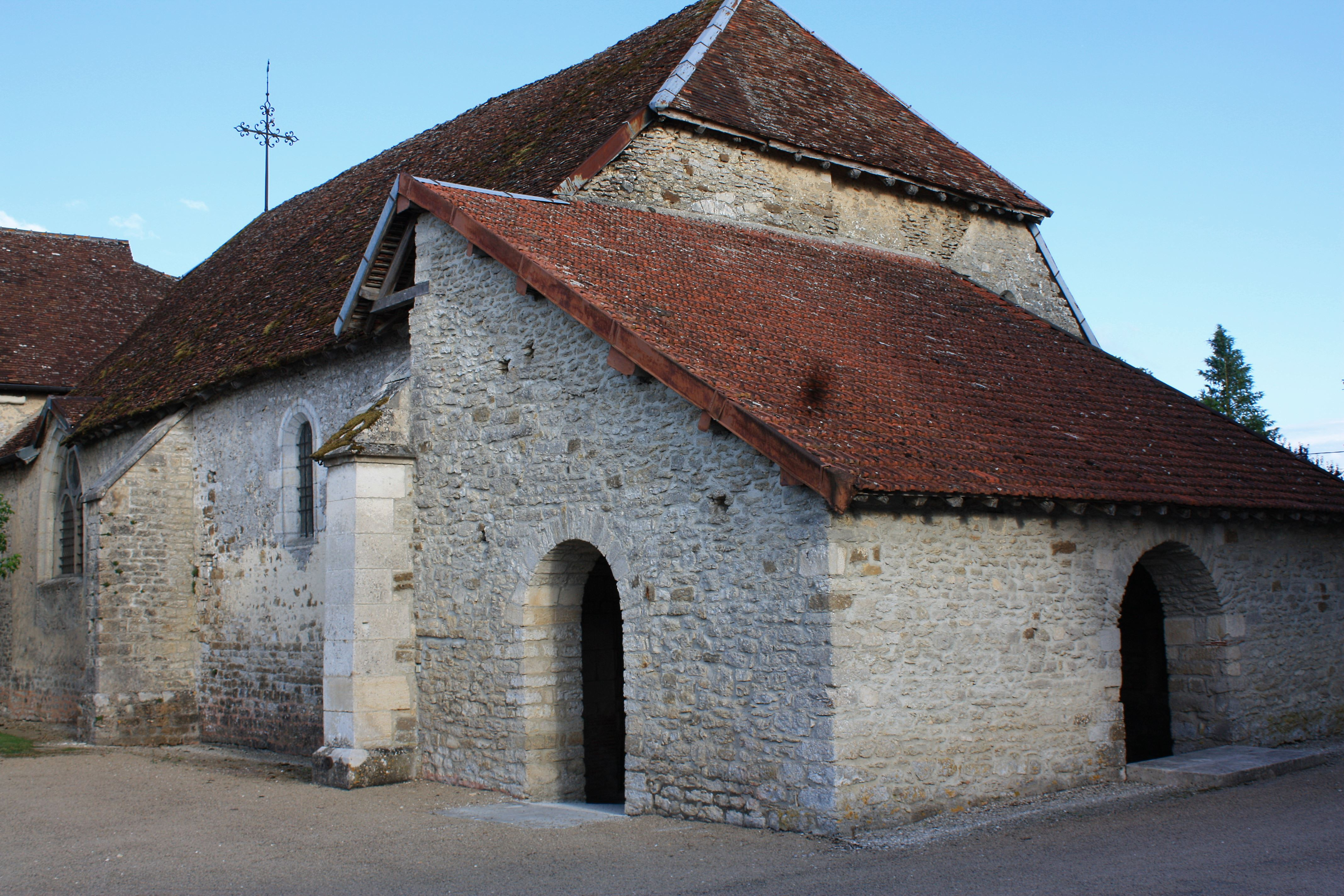
- The church in Virey-sous-Bar

- Coat of arms
- Location of Virey-sous-Bar
- Location within France Location within Grand Est
- Coordinates: 48°08′29″N 4°18′21″E
- Country: France
- Region: Grand Est
- Department: Aube
- Arrondissement: Troyes
- Canton: Bar-sur-Seine

Government
  - Mayor (2020–2026): Isabelle Tobiet-Dossot
- Area^{1}: 10.85 km^{2} (4.19 sq mi)
- Elevation: 148 m (486 ft)
- Population (2023): 588
  - Density: 54.2/km^{2} (140/sq mi)
- Time zone: UTC+01:00 (CET)
  - Summer (DST): UTC+02:00 (CEST)
- INSEE/Postal code: 10437 /10260
- ^{1} French Land Register data, which excludes lakes, ponds, glaciers > 1 km^{2} (0.386 sq mi or 247 acres) and river estuaries.

Virey-sous-Bar (French pronunciation: [viʁɛ su baʁ], literally Virey under Bar) is a commune in the Aube department in north-central France. In Medieval Latin, it was known as Vireium.

== Population ==
Historical population
Year	Pop.	±% p.a.
1968	575	—
1975	586	+0.27%
1982	570	−0.39%
1990	658	+1.81%
1999	660	+0.03%
2007	653	−0.13%
2012	632	−0.65%
2017	621	−0.35%
2023	588	−0.91%
Source: INSEE

== See also ==
- Communes of the Aube department
