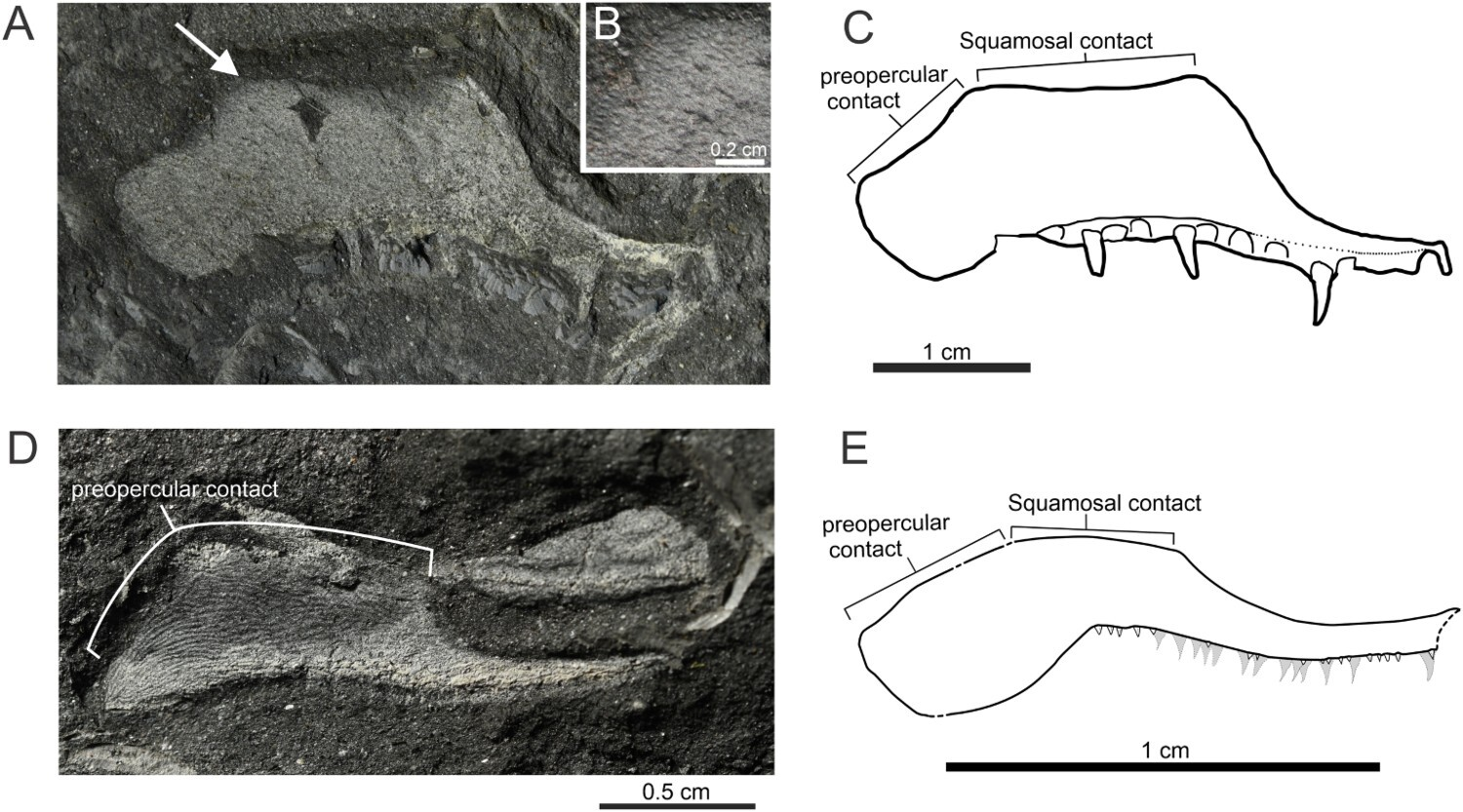
- Maxilla of Amazinyomakhulu (A, B, C) compared with that of an undescribed actinopterygian (D) and Strunius (E)

Scientific classification
- Kingdom: Animalia
- Phylum: Chordata
- Clade: Sarcopterygii
- Order: †Onychodontiformes
- Family: †Onychodontidae
- Genus: †Amazinyomakhulu; Gess & Ahlberg, 2026

Type species
- †Amazinyomakhulu mallinsonia Gess & Ahlberg, 2026

= Amazinyomakhulu =

Amazinyomakhulu Temporal range: 372.15–358.86 Ma Late Devonian (Famennian)

Extinct genus of bony fishes

Amazinyomakhulu is a genus of onychodont lobe-finned fish from the Devonian-aged Waterloo Farm lagerstätte of South Africa. The type and only known species, Amazinyomakhulu mallinsonia, is known from an isolated maxilla discovered in 2008, or upper jaw, and was described and named in 2026. Its upper jawbone had a hatcher shape, with a uniquely long articulation for the squamosal bone and a clear divide between a deep posterior section and slender forward projection that would have formed the bottom rim of a large eye. It has large teeth which were relatively low in number. Living in an estuary in a region that was near the South Pole in the Late Devonian, it is the last known onychodont in the fossil record and lived alongside some of the earliest tetrapods and a diverse assortment of other fish.

== Discovery and naming ==
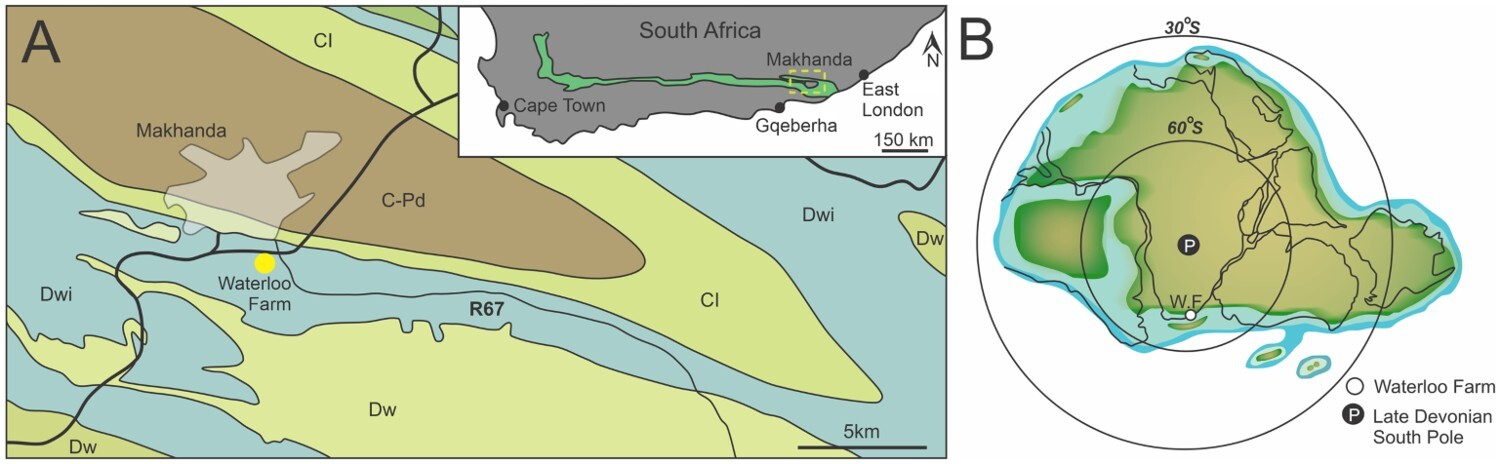
Map showing polar latitude of the Waterloo Farm locality during the Late Devonian

The only known specimen of Amazinyomakhulu was discovered in the rocks of the Witpoort Formation, part of the Waterloo Farm lagerstätte of South Africa, during roadwork performed in 2008. It was collected as part of the Devonian Ecosystems Project and housed in the collections of the Albany Museum in Makhanda, where it was given the specimen number AM5880. The fossil consists of a single maxilla, a bone of the upper jaw, along with three teeth rooted in the maxilla. It was described and named in a 2026 study by Robert Gess and Per E. Ahlberg in a 2026 study. The genus name, Amazinyomakhulu, is derived from an isiXhosa term meaning "big tooth", in reference to the large size of the animal's teeth. The species name, A. mallinsonia, is in reference to Clyde Mallinson, who supported work in at Waterloo Farm in 2001 and 2002 through his company Geodatec when other sources of funding were unavailable. It is the first onychodont known from a high latitude setting, following the reassessment of a prior supposed onychodont specimen as mistakenly identified.

== Description ==
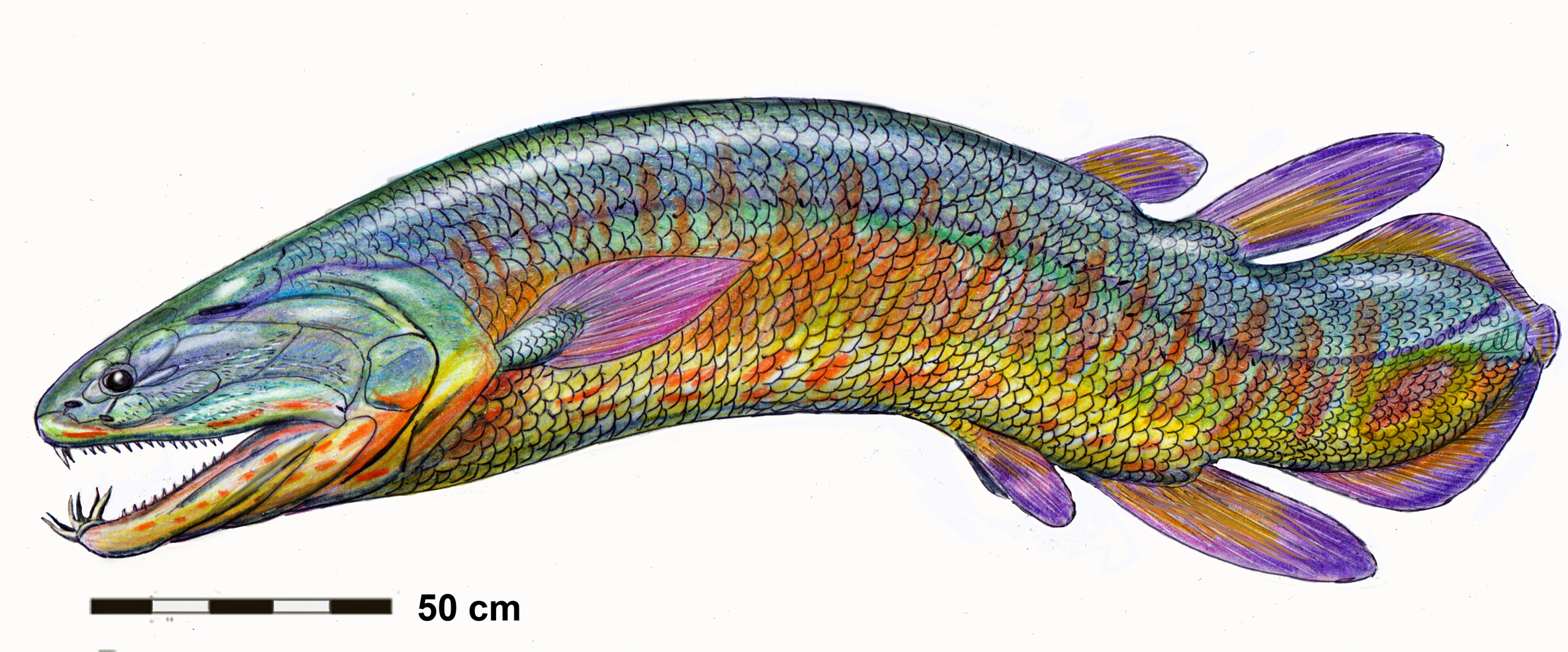
Life reconstruction of Onychodus, a close relative

The maxilla of Amazinyomakhulu, the only known bone, is hatchet shaped, with surfaces along its top for articulation with the preoperculum and squamosal bones. These traits are typical of oncyhodonts, as is the lack of apparent quadratojugal, and the possession of two distinct articulations rather than a single combined articulating surface distinguishes it from actinopterygian fish with a similar jaw shape. Its maxilla is especially similar to that of the genera Onychodus and Strunius, possessing an S-shaped tooth margin and sharing a long and slender forward projection with a deep posterior section with Strunius in particular. This projection underlies the eye socket, so it is likely that Amazinyomakhulu had a very large eye socket similar to Strunius. Unlike Strunius, however, the transition between the posterior and forward projecting sections is especially sharp and the posterior section has an especially high profile. Additionally, the squamosal articulation is significantly longer than the preopercular articulation, also unique to the species.

The teeth of the species are especially large compared to its relative, and distinctly fewer in number than any other oncyhodont, with only nineteen tooth positions. Other onychodonts such as Strunius can have forty or more teeth, all smaller than those preserved in Amazinyomakhulu. It was noted, however, that some onychodonts possess an inner row of larger teeth and an outer row of smaller, more numerous teeth. Thus, the presence of an outer row with a more typical tooth count cannot be ruled out based on the known material.

== Palaeoenvironment ==
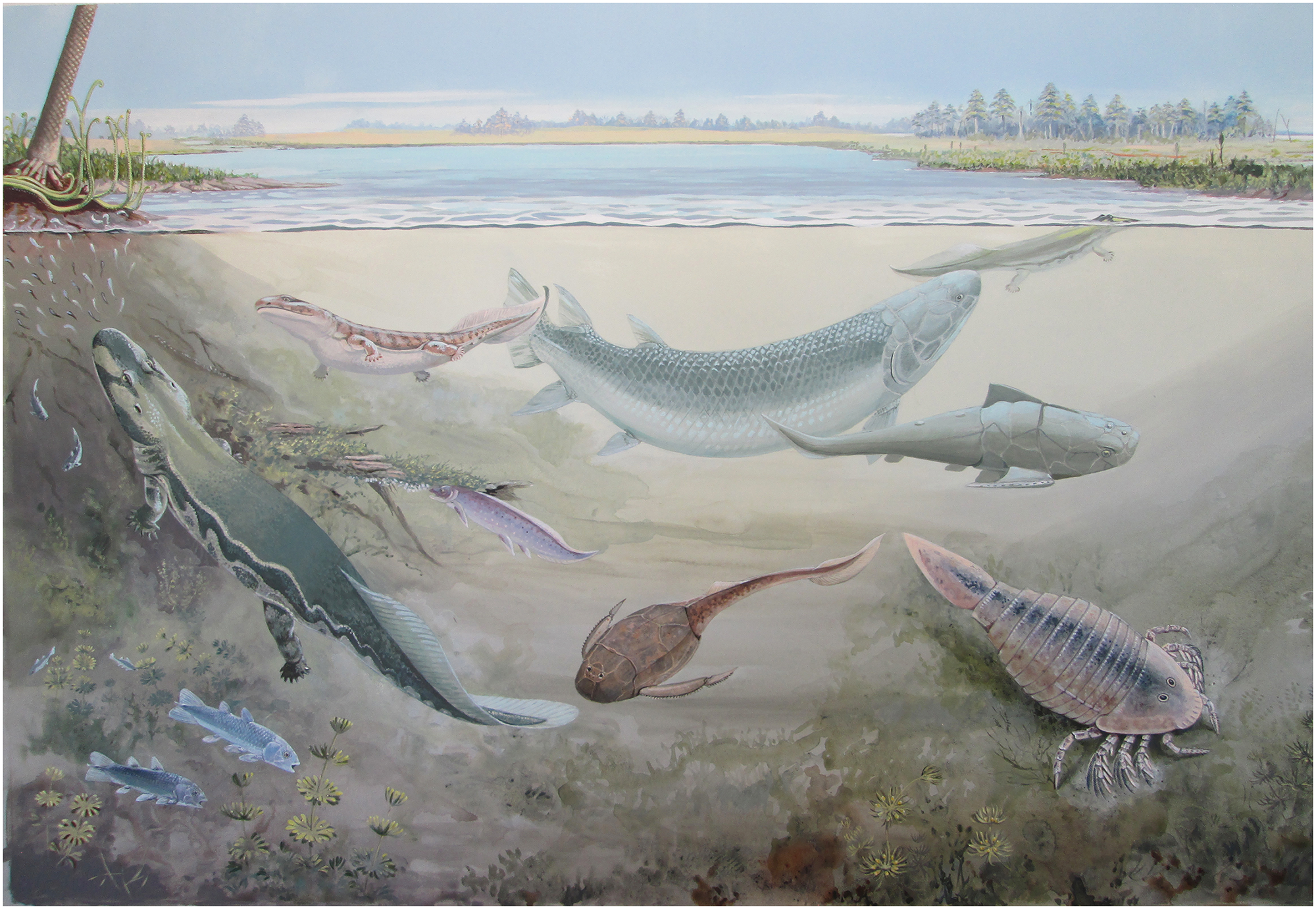
Reconstruction of the palaeoenvironment of the Waterloo Farm site

The Waterloo Farm site, where the only known fossil of Amazinyomakhulu was found, is deposited in modern-day South Africa but would have been near the South Pole at a very high latitude during the Devonian. It is the only site known anywhere in the world that demonstrates what high-latitude Polar ecosystems were like during the Devonian period. In particular, it helps demonstrate the ecological context in which some of the first tetrapods evolved. It is thought to have represented an estuary environment, accumulating animals that lived in a variety of salinities from freshwater to marine within the broader ecosystem, and salinity changing along with the seasons. Terrestrial fossils are also especially common compared to other Devonian sites, with an abundance of invertebrates and plants. Animals documented from Waterloo include lampreys, a diverse assortment of placoderms, acanthodians and other cartilaginous fish, and bony fish including actinopterygians and lobe-finned fish such as Amazinyomakhulu. Other lobe-finned fish from the site include the coelacanth Serenichthys, the lungfish Isityumzi, the giant eotetrapodiform fish Hyneria, and a rhizodont that may represent the genus Gooloogongia. Two early tetrapods, Tutusius and Umzantsia, are also known from Waterloo and likewise belong to Sarcopterygii, the group including lobe-finned fish.

Similarities have been noted to the fauna of the Red Hill locality of the Catskill Formation of Pennsylvania in the United States, which has many close relatives of the fish found at Waterloo Farm including the shared presence of Hyneria, Groenlandaspis, Bothriolepis. Thus, it is interpreted that there was a strong degree of faunal interchange between the Gondwanan ecosystem of Amazinyomakhulu and the Euramerican realm represented by Red Hill. Likewise, Amazinyomakhulu supports interchange between these regions due to its similarity to Strunius, which is Euramerican. It is youngest known onychodont anywhere in the world, with Onychodus dating to the slightly earlier Frasnian age, Strunius found in the Frasnian and Fammennian, and all other onychodonts predating the Late Devonian. It is thought that onychodonts wouljd have lived in both freshwater and marine ecosystems.
