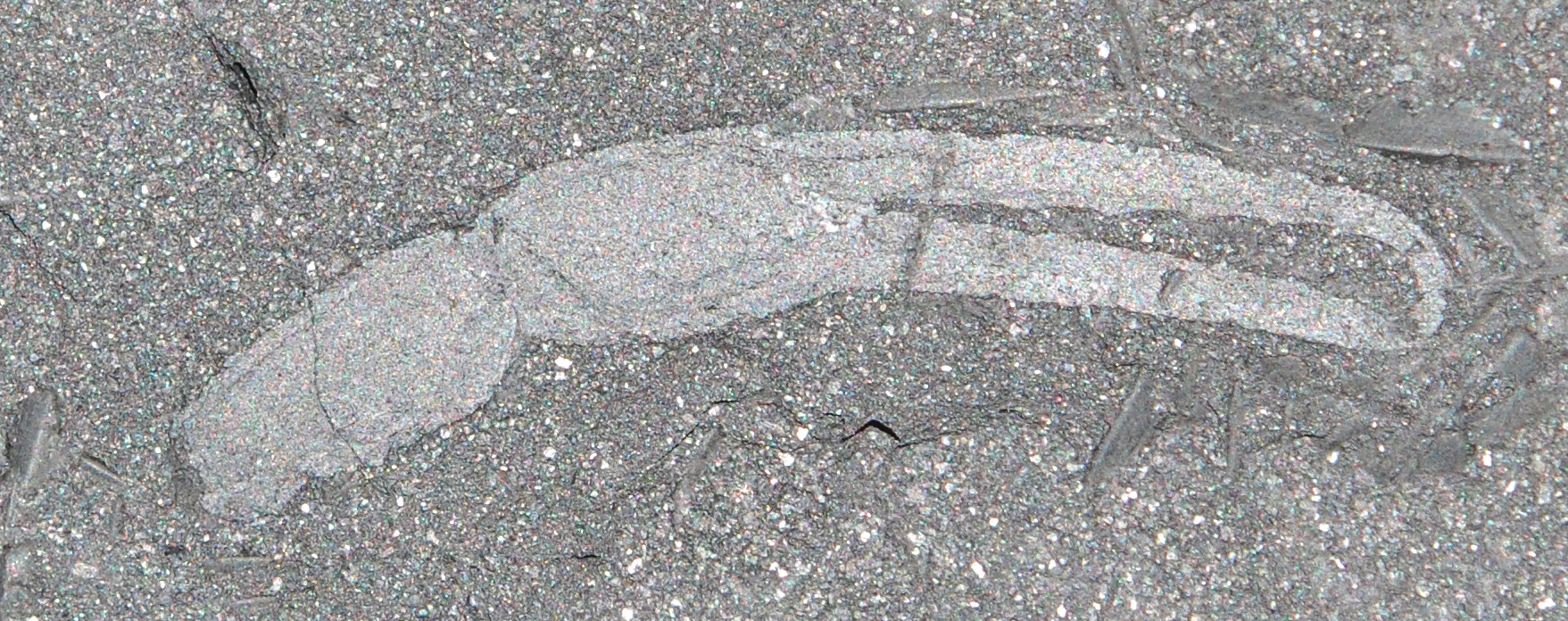
- Pincer
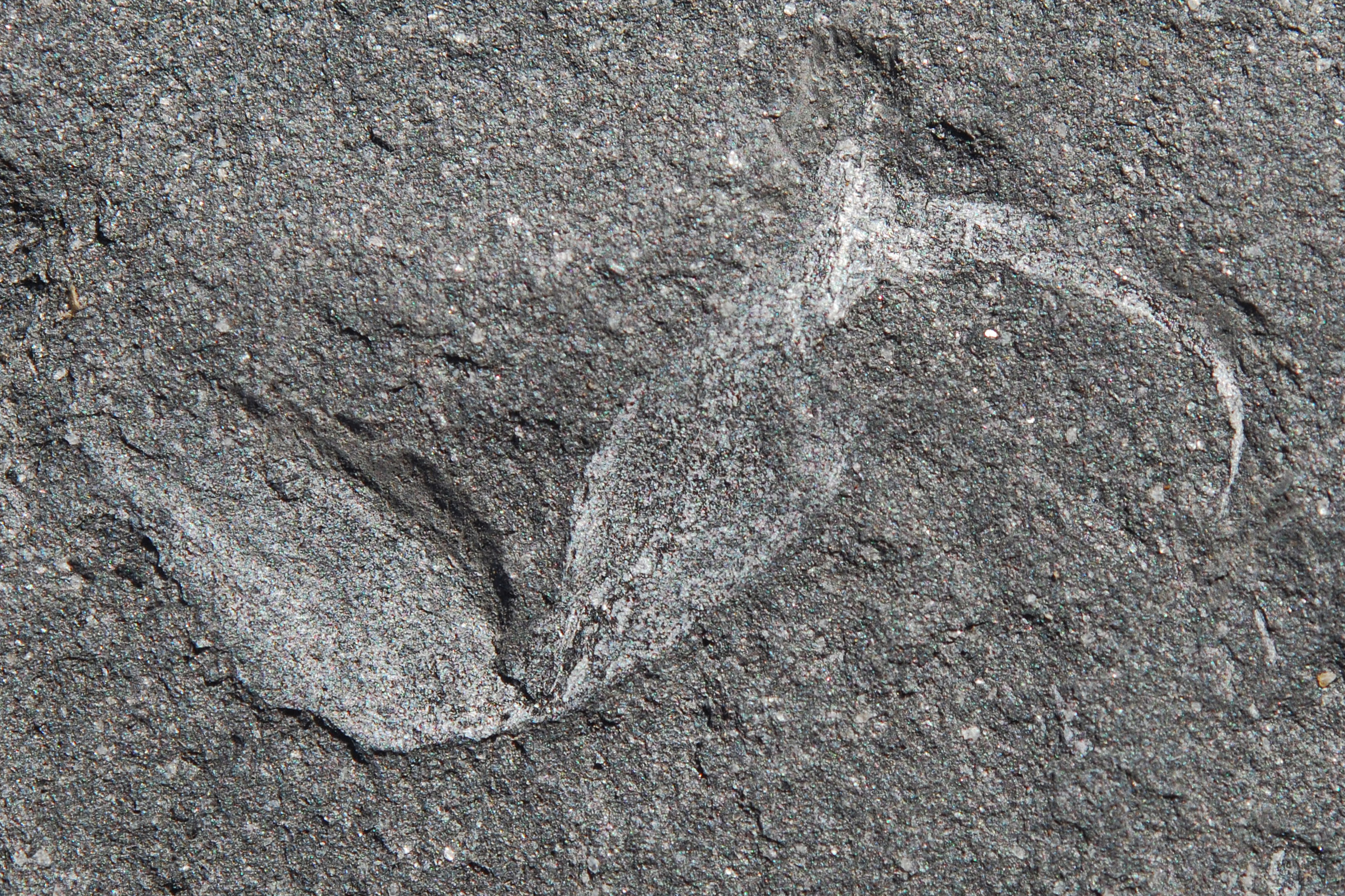
- Sting, or telson

Scientific classification
- Kingdom: Animalia
- Phylum: Arthropoda
- Subphylum: Chelicerata
- Class: Arachnida
- Order: Scorpiones
- Family: incertae sedis
- Genus: †Gondwanascorpio; Gess, 2013
- Species: †G. emzantsiensis

Binomial name
- †Gondwanascorpio emzantsiensis Gess, 2013

= Gondwanascorpio =

Gondwanascorpio Temporal range: Famennian

Extinct genus of scorpion from late Devinian Gondwana

Coordinates: 33°19′24″S 26°32′13″E

Gondwanascorpio emzantsiensis is an extinct Gondwanan scorpion that lived 360 million years ago in the Devonian. Its fossil remains, clearly showing pincer and sting, were discovered in rocks of the Witteberg Group near Grahamstown in South Africa. At present, this scorpion is the oldest known land-dwelling animal from Gondwana, which in Devonian times was separated from Laurasia by a deep ocean. At the time, the fossil site was only 15° from the South Pole, but rather than arctic-like tundra, the region was probably wooded, providing ample insect life for food. Previously, only two scorpion species were known from the late Devonian – Hubeiscorpio gracilitarsus from China and Petaloscorpio bureaui from Canada. The species was described by Robert Gess of Wits University in the journal African Invertebrates. The specific epithet derives from umZantsi, the isiXhosa word for "south", sometimes used for South Africa.

The shale containing the fossil was discovered as far back as 1985 during construction of the N2 bypass outside Grahamstown. The site consists of black carbonaceous shale formed from anaerobic mud deposited in a marine estuary on the Agulhas Sea. A variety of organic remains was found in this setting, including algae, terrestrial plants, and fish. Invertebrate remains are of small bivalves, ostracods, clam shrimp, and a eurypterid. Fossil material has been greatly compressed and original tissue replaced by metamorphic mica altered to chlorite during uplift. To prevent rockfalls onto the road from the unstable formation, the steep slopes were cut back again in 1999 and once more in 2007–08. During these upgrades, Gess managed to obtain a large sample of rock blocks with the help of the road construction company, and worked intermittently on exposing their contents.

Evidence of early terrestrial animal life, until this discovery, had been found only in northern Pangaea or Laurasia, currently comprising North America and Asia. Some 416 million years ago at the end of the Silurian period and during the Devonian period, primitive insects of Laurasia were being preyed upon by early scorpions and spiders, whose ancestors had also come from aquatic and marine environments. Initially, life on Earth was restricted to marine environments and migration onto land at first was confined to plants, which evolved into relatively complex organisms during the Devonian period. This plant colonisation was followed by plant and detritus feeders, such as primitive insects and millipedes. With the Carboniferous period, early vertebrates emerged from the water and were feeding on the invertebrates already there.

Palaeontologists believe that the presence of this scorpion in Gondwana, in many ways resembling Laurasian taxa, supports the idea of a relatively uniform terrestrial ecosystem by the end of the Devonian. It was characterised by ubiquitous plant genera such as the index fossil Archaeopteris, which has also been collected from Waterloo Farm. Gondwanan and Laurasian marginal marine ecosystems also tended to resemble each other towards the end of the Devonian, possibly caused by a closing of the gap between Laurasia and Gondwana.

== See also ==
- Priscomyzon riniensis the earliest known lamprey, found in Famennian South Africa
- Serenichthys kowiensis an early coelacanth, found in Famennian South Africa
