= Waterloo Farm lagerstätte =

Site in South Africa with a wide range of fossils from high-latitudinal Gondwana

Coordinates: 33°19′25″S 26°32′16″E

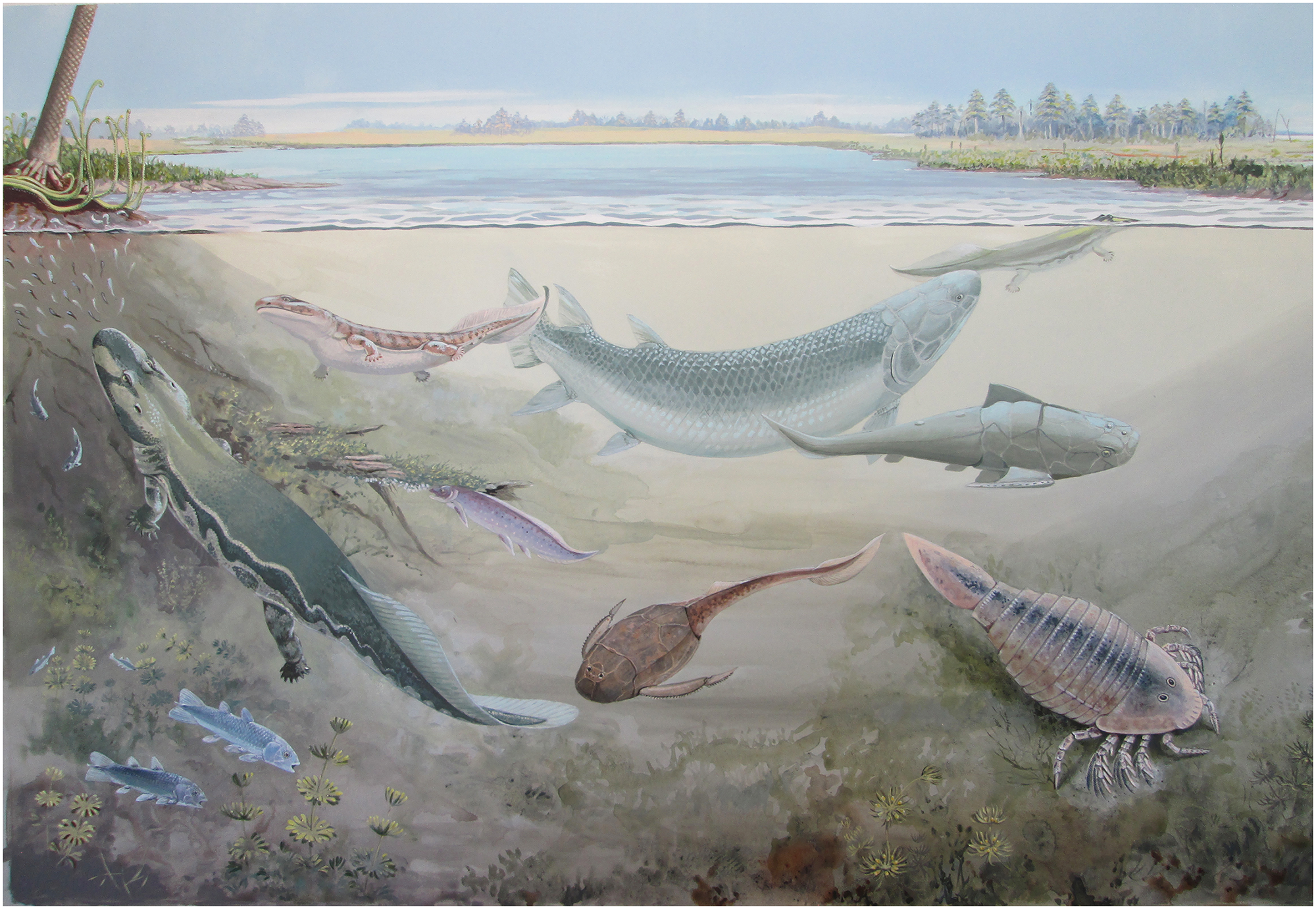
Reconstruction of paleoenvironment of Waterloo Farm.

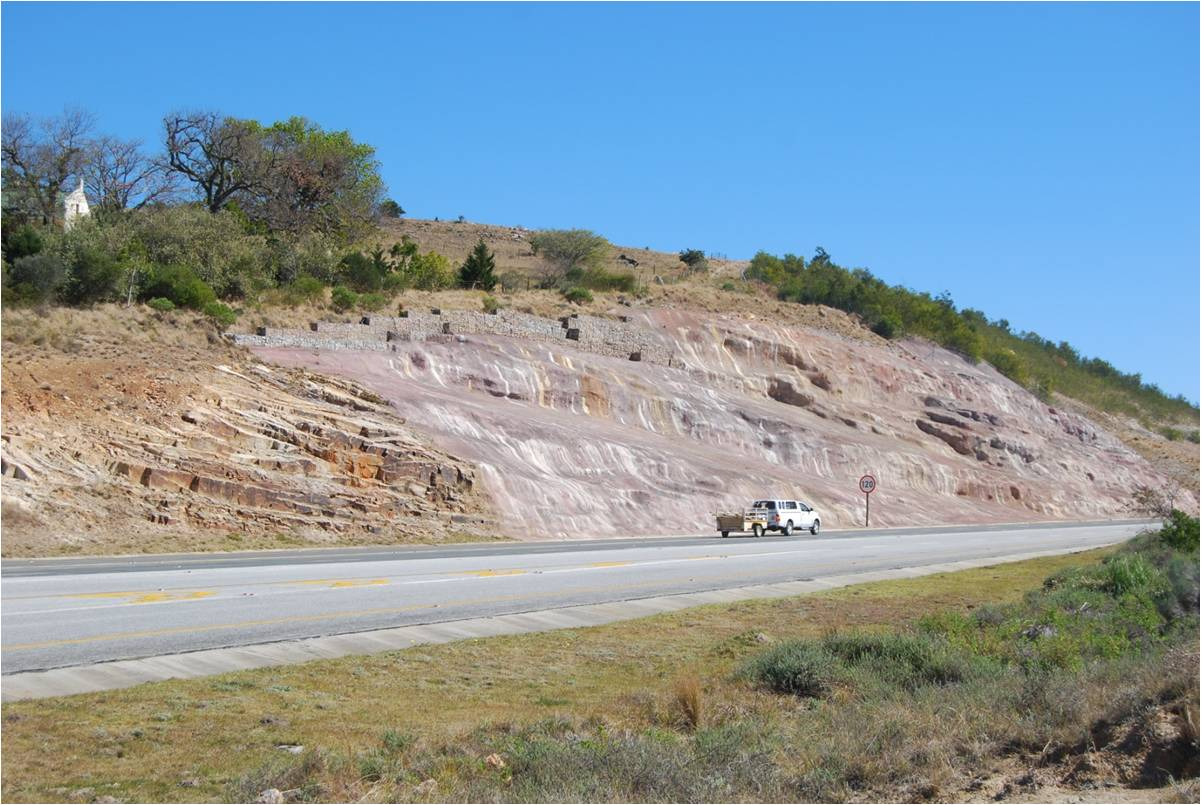
Waterloo Farm in 2016.

The Waterloo Farm lagerstätte is a Famennian lagerstätte in South Africa that constitutes the only known record of a near-polar Devonian coastal ecosystem.

== History and discovery ==
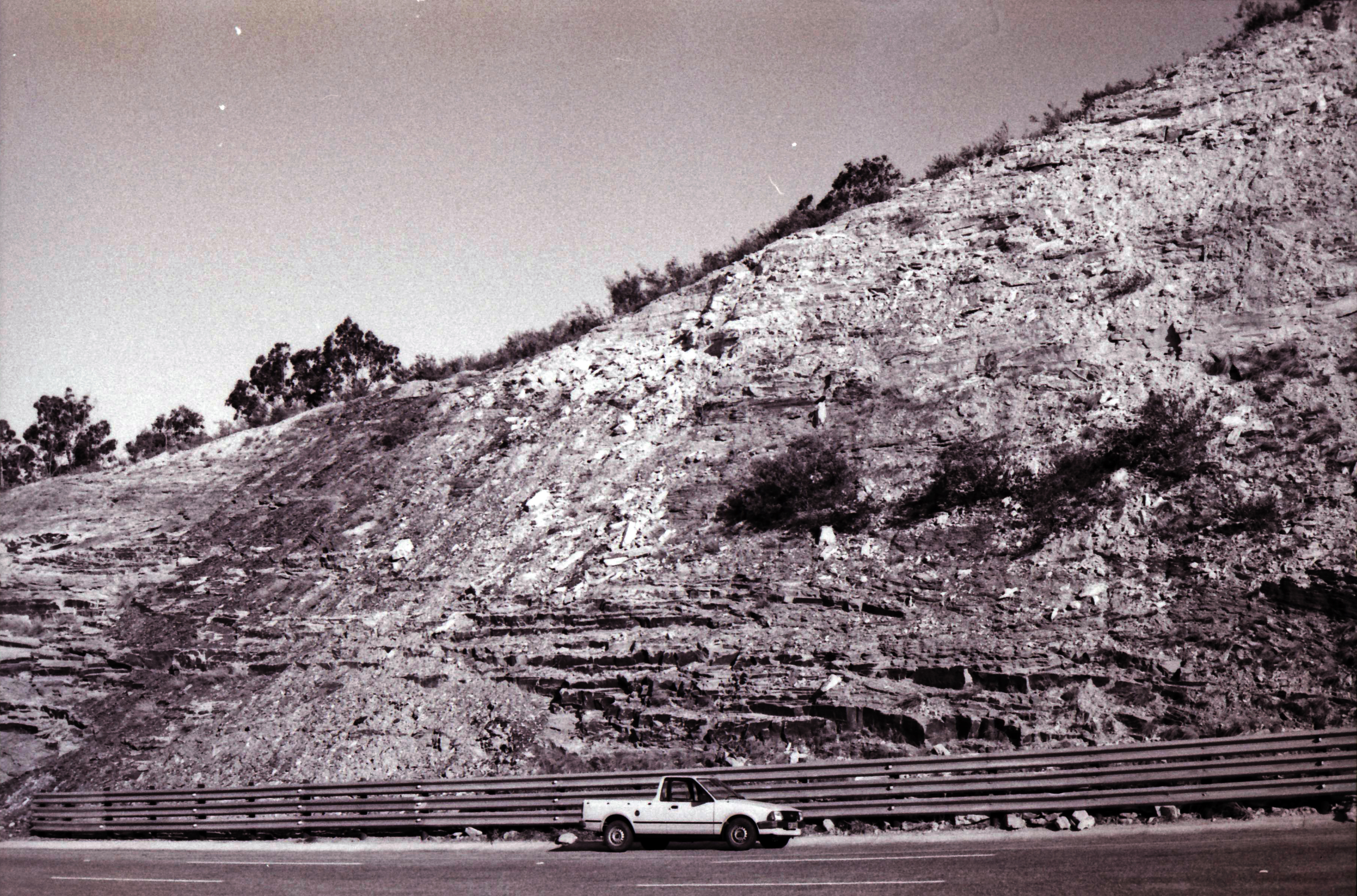
Waterloo Farm in 1988.

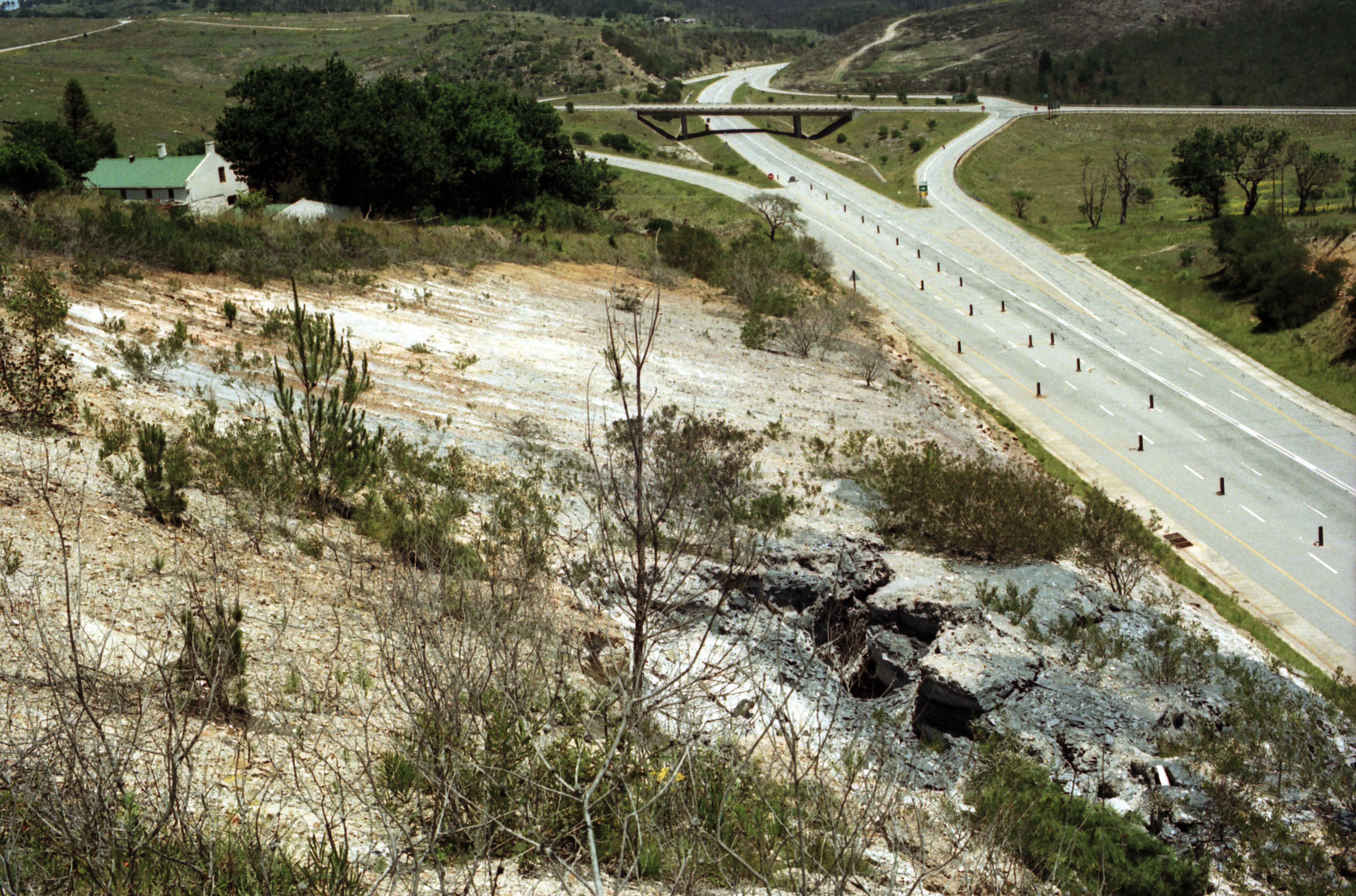
Waterloo Farm main fossil site following the 1999 roadworks.

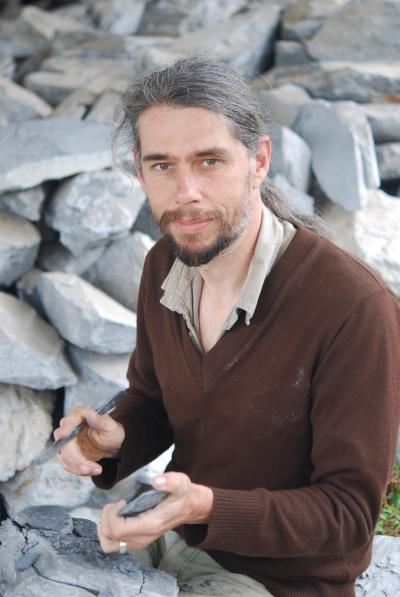
Robert Gess, main researcher of Waterloo Farm Lagerstätte

The Waterloo Farm Lagerstätte is an approximately 360 million year old Famennian (latest Devonian) fossil-rich locality of the Witpoort Formation (Witteberg Group, Cape Supergroup) in Makhanda (former Grahamstown) within the Eastern Cape Province, South Africa. Before its discovery very little was known of life during the Famennian (see Late Devonian extinction) in what is now southern Africa. This is largely due to the fact that fossils in the Witpoort Formation generally occur in black anaerobically deposited metashale that rapidly degrades near surface and is therefore rarely seen in natural outcrop. As is the case with many other scientific discoveries, the discovery of Waterloo Farm was accidental.

Uprisings against the apartheid system in South Africa had by the mid-1980s escalated to violent protests, particularly in the 'townships' (designated black residential areas). Prior to that the N2, the main road linking the industrial ports of Port Elizabeth (now Gqeberha) and East London, ran through then Grahamstown, including its township. By 1985, protests and stoning of cars had made it unsafe for traffic to drive through the townships. As a result the local government proposed the construction of a new road that would serve as a bypass around the townships. Due to limited options, it was decided that the bypass would be constructed through the valleyed countryside to the south of then Grahamstown. This involved excavation of extensive road cuttings through hills and spurs of the Rietberg and utilisation of the resultant rubble to build viaducts across the intervening valleys. Amongst the small farms from which land was appropriated for the road was Waterloo Farm, owned by Rhodes University Botany professor, Roy Lubke - with one cutting passing virtually through the farm yard. At a braai (barbeque) held by Roy Lubke one afternoon, a colleague Dr Mark Aken wandered off to the top of the cutting and peered down the slope. He returned to his colleagues to inform them that there were plant fossils in the disturbed black shale. Roy Lubke mentioned this to Dr Fred Gess, an entomologist, who passed the information on to his son Robert Gess. As Robert Gess had a great interest in the fossils of the Eastern Cape he immediately made his way out to the roadworks where he was struck by the uniquely well-preserved nature of the fossils. With the encouragement of his supervisor and mentor Dr Norton Hiller of the Rhodes Geology Department, he started assembling a collection of the fossils. In 1991 Fiona Taylor, an honours student of Dr Hiller, conducted a short study on the geological context of the deposit, and also published a preliminary note on the fossils, including some of those from Gess' collection. During a short combined excavation by Gess and Taylor, more material was found including remains of large armour-plated (placoderm) fish, later identified as Africa's only known species of Bothriolepis. Taylor's sedimentological work was presented in an article titled "Late Devonian shoreline changes: an analysis of Witteberg Group stratigraphy in the Grahamstown area" published in 1992 (Hiller and Taylor). In 1993, Hiller employed Robert Gess to conduct a thorough palaeontological study and his excavations continued until 1995, after the emigration of Dr Hiller. This phase of research resulted in a number of papers, which were the subject of his master's degree.

By the mid-90's, the road cutting was frequently collapsing due to the dip direction of the strata being towards the road. This led to a near permanent closure of one lane for safety reasons. After there had been a failed attempt to mitigate the situation with steel barriers in the mid-nineties, the newly established South African National Road Agency Limited (SANRAL) published a call for tenders to upgrade the road. This would prove a propitious opportunity for Robert Gess as, by this time, he was struggling to secure further funding for excavations and research. In September 1999, Gess, who had taken up residence in Bathurst (45 km away from Makhanda), heard that a group of consulting engineers from Jeffares and Green (now known as JG Africa) had been awarded the tender to cut back and stabilise the cuttings. He immediately contacted the company and SANRAL to inform them of the sensitivity of the site. SANRAL made funds available for Gess to rescue some of the shale for scientific research. This was hand mined in blocks by Gess and a team under his direction before being transported on a flat-bed truck to his property in Bathurst. Gess built a shed roof over the sample to protect them from the rapid decay that characterises the shale when exposed to weather. It is from meticulous excavation of these rescued blocks that most subsequent discoveries have been and continue to be made. A similar process during further roadworks in 2007 and 2008 yielded an even larger haul of fossiliferous blocks which are stored in sheds constructed by SANRAL.

The fossils are housed and researched by the Devonian Ecosystems project, (funded by the Millennium Trust and South African Centre of Excellence in Palaeosciences) in the Albany Museum's Devonian lab at 87 Beaufort Street, Makhanda (formerly Rhini or Grahamstown). They have provided the material for extensive research by Dr Rob Gess and his collaborators, and an ongoing stream of significant papers.

== Contributions to palaeontological material ==
Waterloo Farm is a globally significant site, providing the only record of a high latitude (near polar) coastal ecosystem, overturning numerous assumptions about high latitude conditions during the latest Devonian. Previous sparse evidence from sub-Saharan Africa, South America and Antarctica had previously led researchers to believe that high latitude conditions precluded extensive vegetation of land and high vertebrate diversity, and that for example Devonian tetrapods only occurred within tropical settings. Waterloo farm has totally disrupted such beliefs, providing evidence for a diversely vegetated adjacent terrestrial habitat with plants including Archaeopteris trees, a diverse estuarine vertebrate fauna and the only known non-tropical Devonian tetrapods. Exceptional soft tissue preservation at Waterloo Farm is unique for a Famennian estuary and allows for reconstruction of an entire estuarine ecosystem, grading from brackish to more marine conditions and including delicate waterweeds, invertebrates and diverse vertebrates. As yet 25 species have been diagnosed from Waterloo Farm and many others provisionally identified. An excess of 50 organisms are however believed to be represented in the extensive collections of the Devonian Ecosystems Project. Together this represents the most holistically studied Devonian tetrapod-bearing locality. Insights provided by the unique soft tissue preservation at the site are also making major contributions to evolutionary biology, such as a growth series of ancient lampreys (Priscomyzon riniensis), that have overturned major, long held, perspectives on vertebrate origins.

== Site characteristics ==
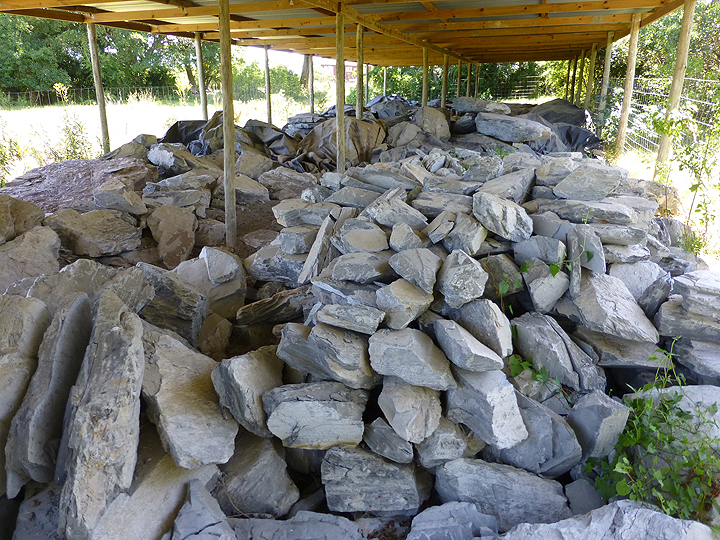
One of the sheds of shale blocks rescued (with the help of SANRAL) from Waterloo Farm roadworks in 2008, for ongoing scientific excavation.

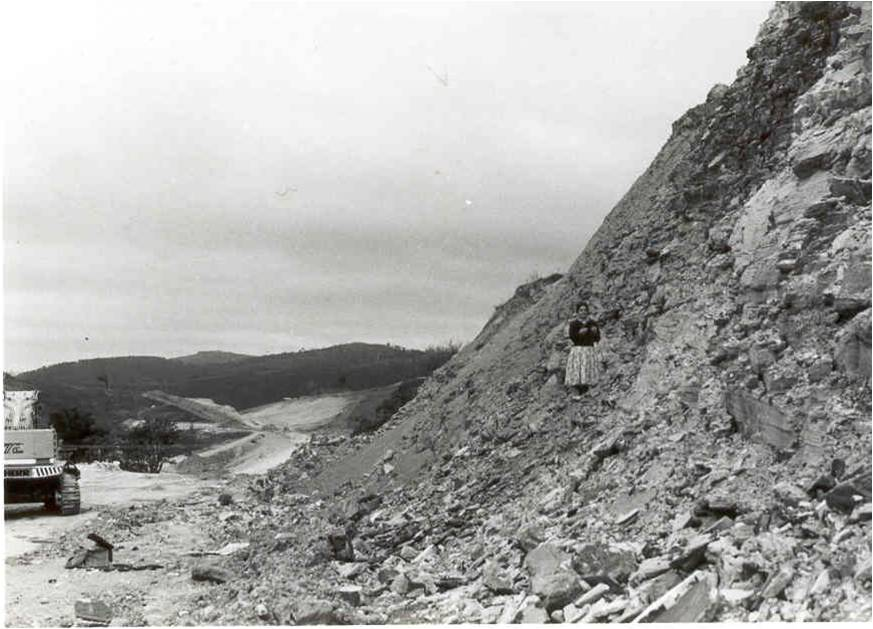
Waterloo Farm during the excavation in 1985.

Witpoort Formation black shales within the Eastern Cape often exhibit cyclical changes in composition, which likely reflect (potentially seasonal) fluctuations in water salinity. Water stratification within the estuarine lake frequently led to anoxic bottom waters, resulting in episodes of exceptional preservation.

Witpoort Formation sediments were deeply buried due to continued basinal subsidence through the Carboniferous, and were subsequently metamorphosed during the massive Permian aged Cape Fold Belt orogenesis. Hundreds of millions of years of erosion and uplift brought the Waterloo Farm shales back up to near surface, they were exposed in 1985, in new road cuttings south of Makhanda/Grahamstown, during construction of a bypass road. On-site excavations were conducted in the 1990s, but the instability of the road cutting led to it being cut back in 1999 and in 2008. On both occasions large quantities of shale were rescued which provides for ongoing excavation. Decades of research has revealed the most important Late Devonian fossil site from what was the southern portion of Gondwanan region incorporating present-day sub-Saharan Africa, South America and western Antarctica. Because the original fine black mud was often very low in oxygen, plants and animals rapidly buried in it sometimes left behind impressions of their soft parts. This is extremely rare in the fossil record which normally only preserves bones, teeth and other hard bits. Exceptionally, what is recorded is the remains of an entire estuarine ecosystem, from delicate waterweeds and seaweeds to small clams, baby fish and the bones of larger fish. Land plants that grew nearby are also preserved, from the remains of small undergrowth species to fronds from the earliest types of trees.

== Fossils ==
More than 20 species new to science have been named from Waterloo Farm, which probably represent about a third of the total number of taxa indicated by remains preserved in the shale. Taxa include the tetrapods Tutusius umlambo and Umzantsia amazana, which are Africa's earliest known tetrapods and the only non-tropical Devonian tetrapods known. The first described fossils from Waterloo Farm comprise remains of sub-Saharan Africa's earliest woody trees (Archaeopteris notosaria). Other fossils from Waterloo Farm include the oldest known land-living animal from Gondwana (the scorpion Gondwanascorpio emzantsiensis), the oldest fossil lamprey in the world (Priscomyzon riniensis) and Africa's oldest coelacanth from the world's earliest known coelacanth nursery (Serenichthys kowiensis).

Other species represented include several species of armour plated (placoderm) fish, spiny finned (acanthodian) fish, sharks, ray-finned (actinopterygian) fish, a range of lobe-finned fish, bivalves; seaweeds; charophyte waterweeds, and a diverse range of plants.

== Paleobiota ==
=== Animalia ===
==== Vertebrata ====
===== Agnatha =====
Agnatha
Genus	Species	Notes	Images
Priscomyzon	P. riniensis	The oldest known lamprey, known from multiple growth series.	

===== Placodermi =====
Placodermi
Genus	Species	Notes	Images
Bothriolepis	B. africana	Antiarch placoderm. Species of Bothriolepis known from highest paleolatitude.	
Groenlandaspis	G. riniensis	A groenlandaspidid arthrodiran placoderm. Probably the most common vertebrate in environment.	
Africanaspis	A. doryssa	A groenlandaspidid placoderm.	
Africanaspis	A. edmountaini	A groenlandaspidid placoderm.	
Arthrodira indet.		At least two taxa are known.	

===== Acanthodii =====
Acanthodii
Genus	Species	Notes	Images
Angelacanthus	A. acus	Exceptionally deep-bodied and long-spined diplacanthiform acanthodian.	
Culmacanthus?	C.? sp.		
Gyracanthides	G. riniensis		
Diplacanthiformes indet.			
Howittacanthidae? indet.		An acanthodiform.	

===== Chondrichthyes =====
Chondrichthyes
Genus	Species	Notes	Images
Plesioselachus	P. macracantha	0.5–1 m (1 ft 8 in – 3 ft 3 in) long chondrichthyan with long spine.	
Antarctilamna	A. ultima	Large-sized elasmobranch. Known from multiple skeletal materials.	
Indeterminate		A complete juvenile specimen, possibly belongs to Antarctilamna.	A. ultima reconstructed after indeterminate juvenile chondrichthyan (AM5741)

===== Actinopterygii =====
Actinopterygii
Genus	Species	Notes	Images
Actinopterygii indet.			

===== Sarcopterygii (includes Tetrapoda) =====
Sarcopterygii
Genus	Species	Notes	Images
Serenichthys	S. kowiensis	Coelacanth known from complete juvenile specimens.	
Hyneria	H. udlezinye	Up to 2.7 m (8 ft 10 in) long tristichopterid.	
Amazinyomakhulu	A. mallinsonia	An onychodont similar to Strunius known from a partial jaw bone.	
Rhizodontida indet.			
Isityumzi	I. mlomomde	Lungfish known from parasphenoid bones.	
Tutusius	T. umlambo	Early tetrapod. First known African Devonian tetrapods.	
Umzantsia	U. amazana	Early tetrapod. First known African Devonian tetrapods.	

==== Invertebrates ====
===== Mollusca =====
Mollusca
Genus	Species	Notes	Images
Naiadites	N. devonicus	Pteriid bivalve. Only known species of Naiadites from Devonian.	

===== Brachiopoda =====
Brachiopoda
Genus	Species	Notes	Images
Dignomia	D. sp.	Described from newly found site in Witpoort Formation, not exactly from Waterloo Farm	

===== Arthropoda =====
Arthropoda
Genus	Species	Notes	Images
Hibbertopteridae indet.		1.5 m (4 ft 11 in) long sweep-feeding stylonurine hibbertopterid eurypterid. May represent Dunsopterus or a close relative. Some researchers have suggested Dunsopterus may be the adult form of Hibbertopterus, though this remains controversial.	
Gondwanascorpio	G. emzantsiensis	Partially known scorpion.	

=== Plantae ===
==== Algae ====
===== Rhodophyta or Phaeophyta =====
Rhodophyta or Phaeophyta
Genus	Species	Notes	Images
Hungerfordia	H. fionae	Algae with unknown affinity, possibly brown algae.	
Yeaia	Y. africana	Brown algae.	

===== Charophyta =====
Charophyta
Genus	Species	Notes	Images
Hexachara	H. setacea	Charophyte algae.	
Hexachara	H. riniensis	Charophyte algae.	
Octochara	O. crassa	Charophyte algae.	
Octochara	O. gracilis	Charophyte algae.	

==== Tracheophyta ====
===== Uncertain =====
Uncertain
Genus	Species	Notes	Images
Flabellopteris	F. lococannensis	Euphyllophyte with uncertain classification.	

===== Zosterophyllopsida =====
Zosterophyllopsida
Genus	Species	Notes	Images
Zosterophyll indet.			

===== Lycopsida =====
Lycopsida
Genus	Species	Notes	Images
Colpodexylon	C. mergae	Lycopsid in the order Protolepidodendrales.	
Colpodexylon	C. pullumpedes	Lycopsid in the order Protolepidodendrales.	
Leptophloeum	L. rhombicum	A lycophyte.	
Kowieria	K. alveoformis	A lycopsid lycophyte.	

===== Iridopteridales =====
Iridopteridales
Genus	Species	Notes	Images
Iridopteridales indet.			

===== Sphenopsida =====
Sphenopsida
Genus	Species	Notes	Images
Rinistachya	R. hilleri	Sphenopsid. Only sphenopsid known from the Devonian of Gondwana.	

===== Progymnospermopsida =====
Sphenopsida
Genus	Species	Notes	Images
Archaeopteris	A. notosaria	A progymnosperm tree. The only high latitude species of Archaeopteris as yet described.	
