= Hungerfordia =

Hungerfordia may refer to:

- Hungerfordia (gastropod), a genus of land snails
- Hungerfordia (alga), a fossil genus of algae
