= Hexachara =

Hexachara Temporal range: Late Devonian 371.1–359.3 Ma

Scientific classification
- Domain: Eukaryota
- Clade: Archaeplastida
- Clade: Viridiplantae
- Division: Charophyta
- Class: Charophyceae
- Order: Charales
- Family: †Eocharaceae (?)
- Genus: †Hexachara; Gess & Hiller, 1995

Species
- Hexachara setacea Gess & Hiller, 1995; Hexachara riniensis Gess & Hiller, 1995

Genus of fossil aquatic green alga

Hexachara is a genus of fossil charophyte (aquatic green alga) that is likely to have formed meadows within sheltered oligohaline reaches of lakes.

== Etymology ==
Hexachara is derived from Greek "hex", meaning six, a reference to the hexaradial symmetry; chara, referring to membership of the Charales. The specific name setacea is derived from Latin "seta", a bristle, that is a reference to the thin pointed branchlet. The specific name riniensis is derived from the isiXhosa word Rhini, which is a traditional name for Grahamstown/Makhanda and the surrounding valley.

== Description ==
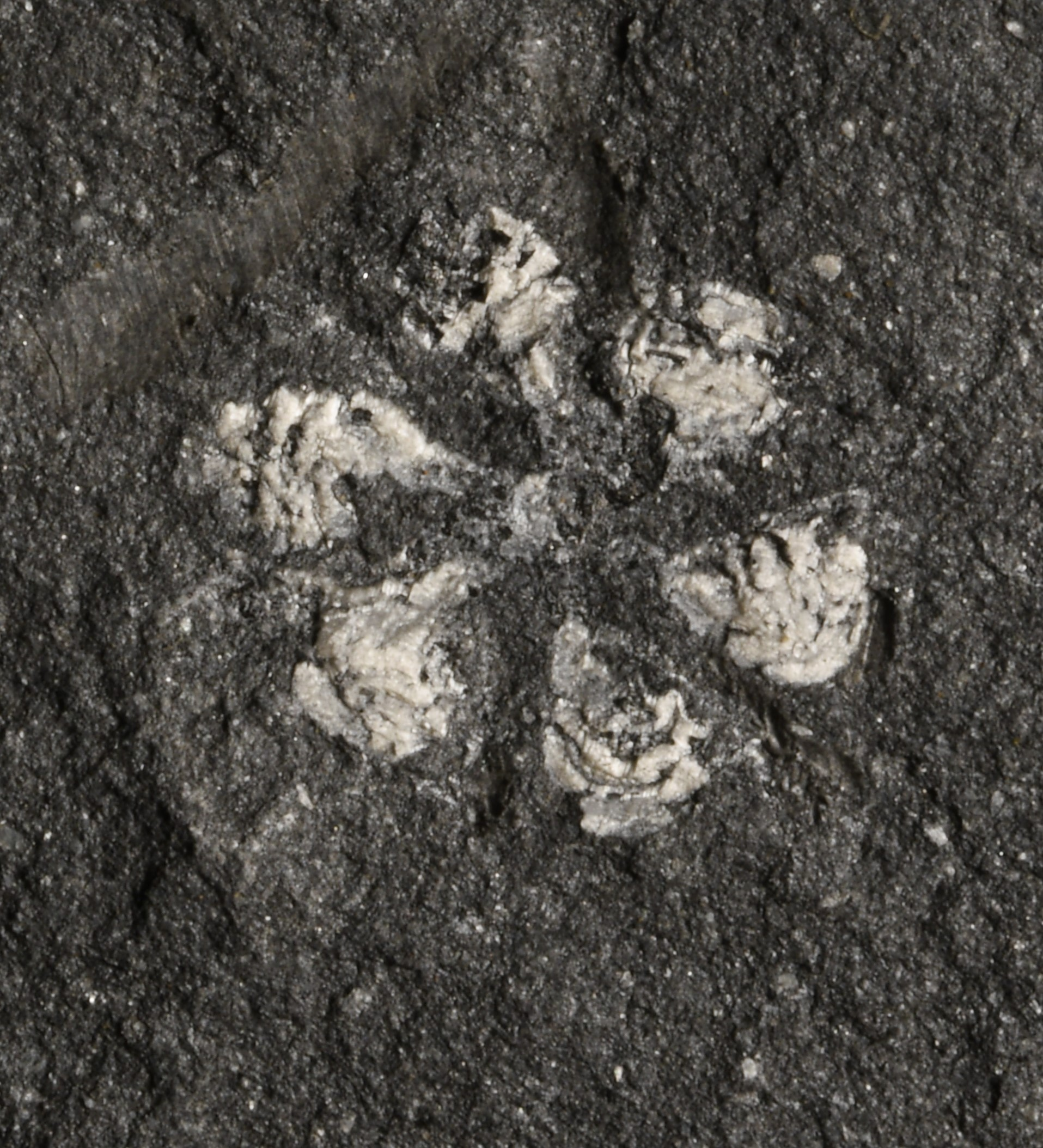
Whorl of Hexachara setacea showing spirally ridged oogonia (approximately 5 mm across).

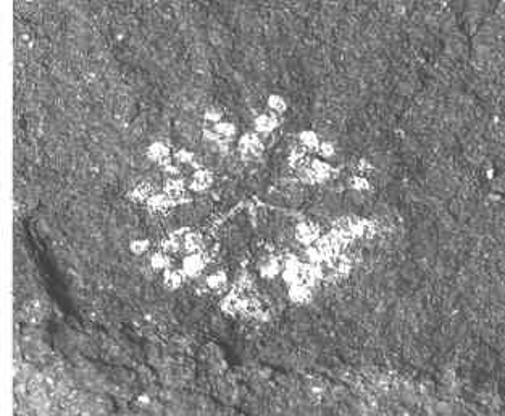
A single fertile whorl of Hexachara riniensis.

The whorls of branches are arranged in a hexaradial symmetrical manner. In Hexachara each node produces a whorl of six laterals, and oogonia are produced on each lateral. The known species to date include Hexachara setacea and Hexachara riniensis that have been recovered from a carbonaceous shale near the top of the Late Devonian, Famennian, Witpoort Formation (Witteberg Group) exposed in a road cutting south of Grahamstown (Waterloo Farm lagerstätte) in South Africa,. Together with Octochara species from the same locality these represent the only reconstructable Devonian charophytes with in situ oogonia.

In H. setacea, internode parts of axis are outwardly uncorticated and about 3–4 mm long and 0.5 mm in diameter. The nodes in H. setacea bear whorls with diameters of about 6 mm and consisting of six radial branches and each branch encompasses a short stalk that gives rise to at least one slender pointed branchlet and carries an oogonium. The compact tips of H. setacea often formed small 'rollers', following fragmentation of axes. These are commonly enclosed by an organic 'halo', interpreted as a film of green algae utilizing the charophyte as an attachment substratum.

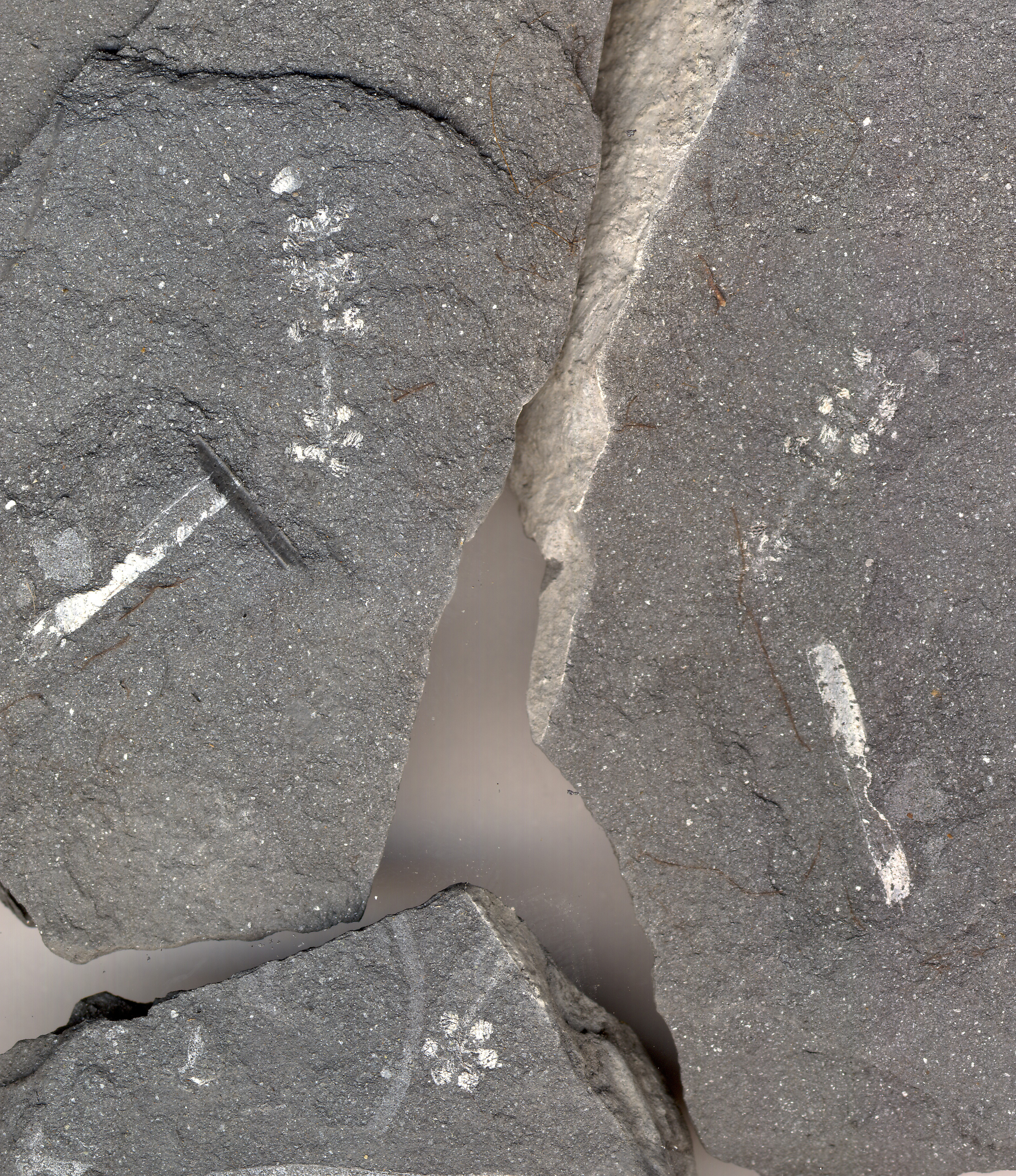
A short axis bearing Hexachara setacea whorls.

In H. riniensis the laterals divide at about one-half of their length into smaller whorls each of which bears six oogonia and the internodes are uncorticated, and about 0.3 mm in diameter. The nodes bear whorls, about 8 mm in diameter, that consist of six radial laterals. Each lateral divides at about one-half of its length to give rise to a secondary hexaradial whorl each branchlet of which carries an oogonium. H. riniensis has a very small oogonia attached to the ends of branchlets of secondary whorls and surrounded by extremely fine hair-like tertiary branchlets. Each oogonium is ovoid, about 1.8 mm long and 1.0 mm wide at widest point, and tapers slightly towards point of attachment.
