= Yeaia =

Scientific classification
- Domain: Eukaryota
- Clade: Diaphoretickes
- Clade: SAR
- Clade: Stramenopiles
- Phylum: Gyrista
- Subphylum: Ochrophytina
- Class: Phaeophyceae
- Order: incertae sedis
- Genus: †Yeaia; Douglas, 1083

Species
- Yeaia flexuosa Douglas, 1983; Yeaia africana Hiller & Gess, 1996

Genus of algae

Yeaia is an extinct genus of brown algae known from the Silurian and Devonian of southern hemisphere locations.

== Species ==
Yeaia flexuosa was described in 1983 and is the holotype of the genus.

Yeaia africana was discovered in Waterloo Farm of Makhanda, Eastern Cape, South Africa in 1996, from a black shale of the Witpoort Formation following an excavation of a road cutting. It was described based on incomplete fossils with strap-like 300 mm long thallus consisting of four or more branches arising by bifurcation, each up to 10 mm wide. The first bifurcation arises after 100 mm and the second after a further 50 mm. The surface of the branches was covered in irregularly distributed speckles each less than 1 mm wide. No central vascular strand were visible on any of the specimens. The specimens, which are kept in the Devonian Ecosystem Laboratory in Makhanda, represent an organism that may have been 500 mm or more in height with long flexible thalloid branches. The general appearance and dimensions (excluding ornamentation) show that Yeaia africana is similar to Yeaia flexuosa from the Late Silurian Baragwanathia plants of central Victoria, Australia. Also, the Australian specimens possess short branches with rounded ends, a feature that is not present in Yeaia flexuosa.
