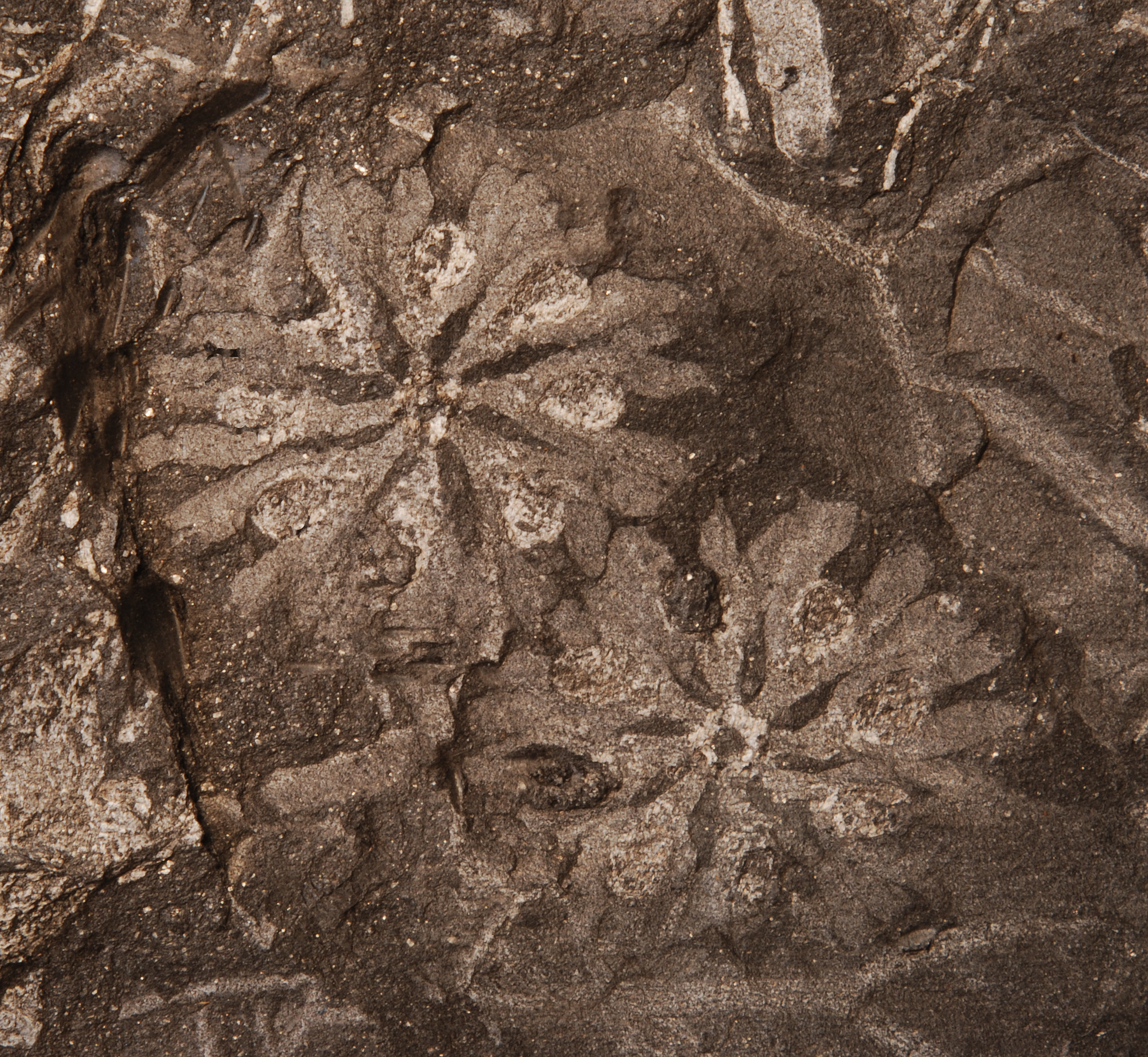
- Two whorls of Octochara crassa

Scientific classification
- Domain: Eukaryota
- Clade: Archaeplastida
- Clade: Viridiplantae
- Division: Charophyta
- Class: Charophyceae
- Order: Charales
- Family: †Eocharaceae (?)
- Genus: †Octochara; R. W. Gess & N. Hiller (1995)

Species
- †Octochara crassa; †Octochara gracilis

= Octochara =

Octochara Temporal range: Famennian

Extinct genus of algae

Octochara is a genus of fossil charophyte (aquatic green alga) from the Famennian (Late Devonian). It is one of two genera of charophyte described from the Waterloo Farm lagerstätte in southern Africa. It and Hexachara, from the same locality provide the oldest record of reconstruct able charophytes with in situ oogonia.

Octochara is derived from a Greek word "octo", meaning eight, a reference to the octoradial symmetry, and "chara", referring to membership of the Charales. In Octochara, a whorl of eight laterals are borne at each node. Each lateral is branched to produce four secondary branches and bears an oogonium.

Two species of Octochara have been described, Octochara crassa and Octochara gracilis. The two species differ in the size and the shape of their secondary branchlets and oogonia. The specific name of O. crassa is derived from Latin, "crassus", meaning fat or thick, a reference to the branchlets. This species has whorls up to 14 mm in diameter and the branchlets are relatively broad with rounded terminations. In O. crassa, the internode parts of axis are unknown at this stage but, based on measurements of the central hole through the whorls, they are estimated to be about 0.7 mm in diameter. Oogonia in O. crassa are attached to the junction at which the radial branches divide and are supported within the four secondary branchlets. Each oogonium is almost spherical, about 1.7 mm long and 1.6 mm wide at widest point but tapering slightly towards the point of attachment They are helically striated in a sinistral direction with 3–5 stria visible in plan view. O. crassa is differentiated from O. gracilis by the relatively greater width of its branches and branchlets which have rounded lobate, as opposed to pointed terminations. The whorls also have a larger diameter.

The specific name of O. gracilis is derived from Latin, "gracills", meaning slender, a reference to its more slender branchlets. O. gracilis comprises whorls up to 10 mm in diameter in which branchlets are narrow with slender tapering terminations. The internode portions of axis in this species appear uncorticated and vary in diameter up to 0.6 mm. In O. gracilis, chains of whorls show that whorl diameter diminishes distally. Each whorl has eight radial branches that quadrifurcate after about one-third of their length. Branchlets of O. gracilis are slender with sharply pointed terminations. The oogonia are attached at the point of division of the branches and is supported within four branchlets. Each oogonium is ellipsoidal, about 1.5mm long and 0.9 mm wide at its broadest point.

Charophyte algae are non marine and can currently be found in lakes and less saline parts of estuaries. Likewise the charophytes at Waterloo Farm have been interpreted as being derived from less saline portions of the palaeo-estuarine environment. The charophyte algae genus is formed in less saline portions of the estuarine system.
