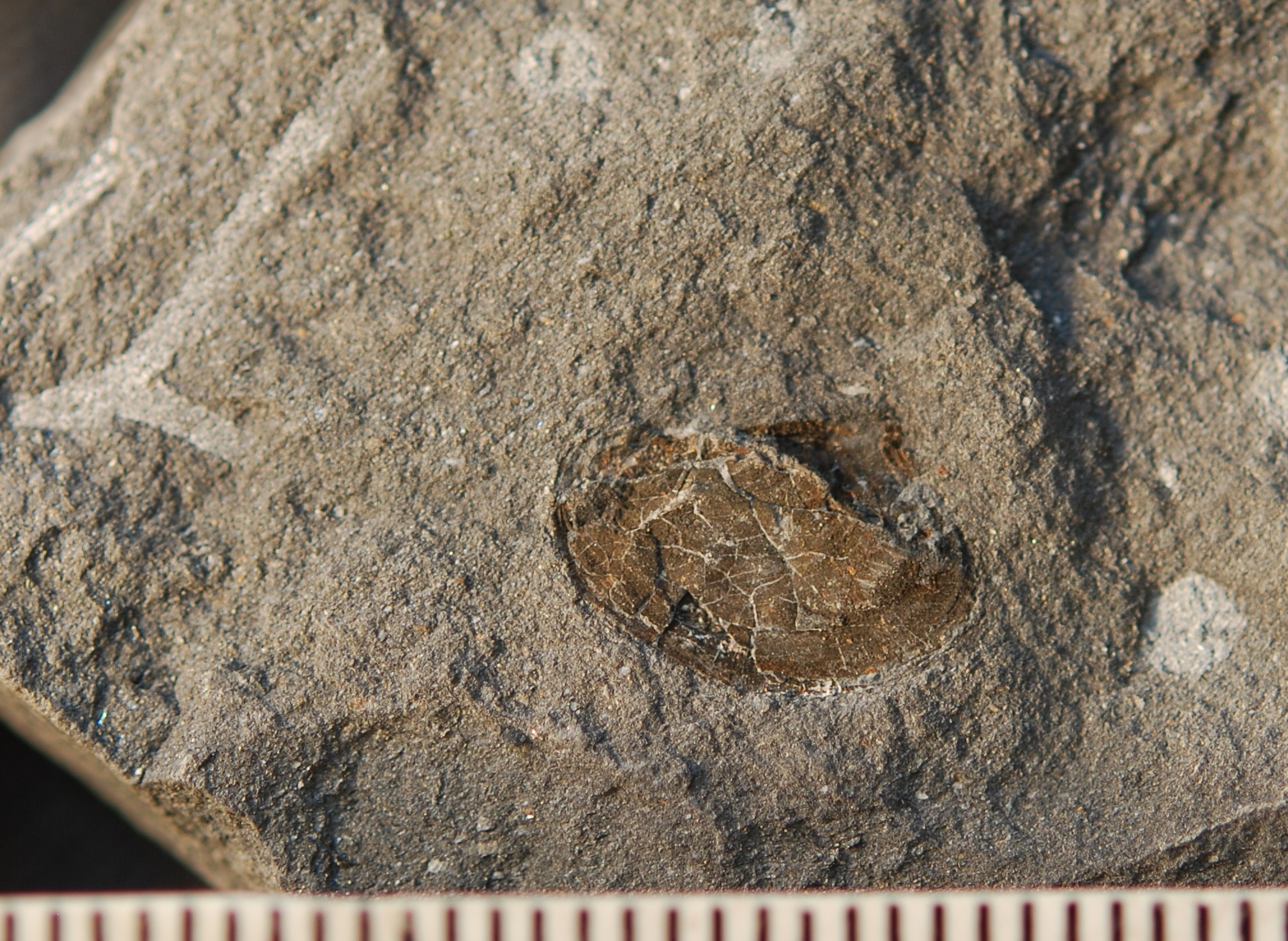
- An internal mould of a Naiadites devonicus from Waterloo Farm lagerstätte

Scientific classification
- Domain: Eukaryota
- Kingdom: Animalia
- Phylum: Mollusca
- Class: Bivalvia
- Order: Pteriida
- Family: †Myalinidae
- Genus: †Naiadites; Dawson, 1860

= Naiadites =

Extinct genus of bivalves

Naiadites is an extinct genus of thin-shelled non-marine bivalve from the Upper Carboniferous coal-measures of Nova Scotia in Canada.

== Species ==
The genus contains the following species:

- Naiadites carbonarius from the Pennsylvanian (Upper Carboniferous) of Nova Scotia in Canada
- Naiadites orhallensis from the Carboniferous of Germany
- Naiadites phillipsi from the Westphalian B–C (Lower–Middle Pennsylvanian) of the Ruhr area in western Germany
- Naiadites devonicus from the Late Devonian of South Africa

N. orhallensis has been described as occurring in dense colonies attached to floating or submerged stems of terrestrial plant wrack.

Naiadites devonicus, known only from the Waterloo Farm lagerstätte deposit, constitutes the dominant preserved aquatic invertebrate therein, with hundreds of valves having been collected, generally ranging between 10 and 25 mm in length. The palaeoenvironment has been interpreted as being a fresh to brackish water habitat within the palaeoantarctic circle. As this is the earliest known Naiadites, Scholtz and Gess have suggested that it may have spread to lower latitudes following the End Devonian Mass Extinction in response to global cooling, suggesting an origin for post extinction taxa appearing at low palaeolatitudes during the early Carboniferous. Gess and Whitfield have suggested that N. devonicus lived attached to the abundant submerged and floating vegetation at Waterloo Farm. Probably concentrated where river(s) entered the estuarine lake carrying suspended particulate organic matter they were likely rafted on floating vegetation into more saline portions of the system and would have provided an important food source for predatory fishes.
