= Kowieria =

Scientific classification
- Kingdom: Plantae
- Clade: Tracheophytes
- Division: Lycopodiophyta
- Genus: †Kowieria
- Species: †K. alveoformis

Binomial name
- †Kowieria alveoformis Gess & Prestianni, 2018

Extinct genus of plants

Kowieria is an extinct genus of lycopsid from the Late Devonian from Waterloo Farm, containing the single species Kowieria alveoformis. As of 2021 it is being characterised as incertae sedis. It was first described in 2017 from a black shale layer interbedded with quartzite strata of the Famennian aged Witpoort Formation (Witteberg Group, Cape Supergroup).

== Etymology ==
The genus name Kowieria is derived from the Kowie River that rises along the ridge on which Waterloo Farm is situated. Alveus is a Latin word for a simple type of boat thus, alveoformis refers to the coracle-like simple sporophylls of the fossil plant.

== Description ==
Only distal portions of the fossils were identified and as such, the description thereof is based on these parts. Their axes range from 48 to 105 mm in length with widths of 2.7 to 4.5 mm. Axis width appear to diminish from proximal to distal ends from 4.5 - 2.4 mm. The presence of tightly arranged elongated leaves in the specimens (found in Waterloo Farm) makes it difficult to measure the axes as the distal part of all preserved axes appears to be considerably smaller. This size decrease reflects the position (as ultimate axes) of the axes fragments of the original plant.

Some fossil fragments clearly show a strobilus connected to a short axial segment. The axis measures 2.2 mm in width closer to the strobilus. The axis does not bear any vegetative leaves. The strobilus measures 13.5 mm in length and shows a dense organisation, although slightly compressed. In most cases, the strobili are found dispersed and show a dense organisation with no vegetative leaves associated with them. The longest strobilus measures 15 mm long. The sporophylls are borne spirally with up to 20 mm long attached to the axis by a small 1.5 to 2 mm long straight pedicel. The pedicel is followed by a curved segment on the underside of the sporophyll lamina, about 4 to 5 mm long, corresponding to the attachment zone of the sporangium. The abaxial side of the sporophyll lamina is curved and measures up to 10 mm long with a width ranging from 0.7 to 1.2 mm.

Kowieria alveoformis is also prominently ornamented megaspores, and thus, showing similarity to isoetales within the taxonomic class Lycopodiopsida.
