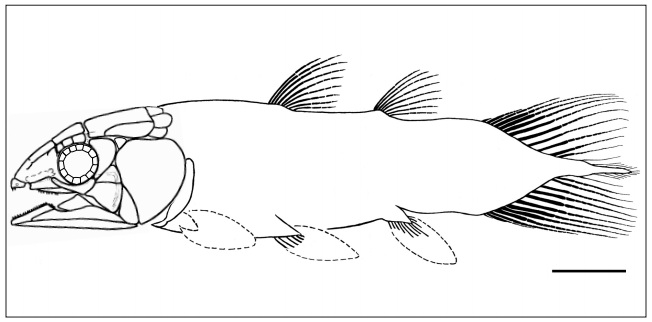
- Fossil interpretation
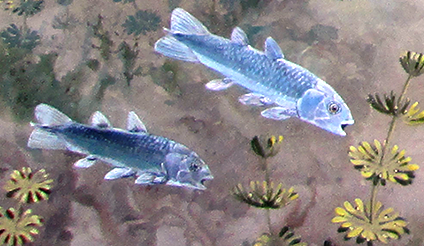
- Life restoration

Scientific classification
- Kingdom: Animalia
- Phylum: Chordata
- Class: Actinistia
- Family: †Diplocercididae
- Genus: †Serenichthys; Gess et al., 2015

Type species
- Serenichthys kowiensis Gess et al., 2015

Synonyms
- Paradiplocercides kowiensis Gess, 2011

= Serenichthys =

Serenichthys Temporal range: Famennian

Genus of coelacanth fish

Coordinates: 33°19′24″S 26°32′13″E

Serenichthys kowiensis is a fossil species of coelacanth described in 2015 from near Grahamstown in South Africa.

Some 30 complete specimens of this new species were found in the black shale lagerstätte on Waterloo Farm, preserved by the mud of an ancient estuary dating back to the Famennian stage of the Late Devonian some 360 million years ago. In an article published in the Zoological Journal of the Linnean Society and jointly authored by paleontologists Michael Coates of the University of Chicago and Robert Gess from the University of the Witwatersrand, the find is described as the earliest coelacanth to be discovered from Africa. Gess first identified coelacanth remains from this locality in the 1990s, but these were poorly preserved and unsuitable for formal description. Subsequent work produced many more specimens, some preserved in fine detail. All specimens of Serenichthys kowiensis have been added to the palaeontological collection of the Albany Museum in Grahamstown.

== Relationships and dating ==
Skull diagram

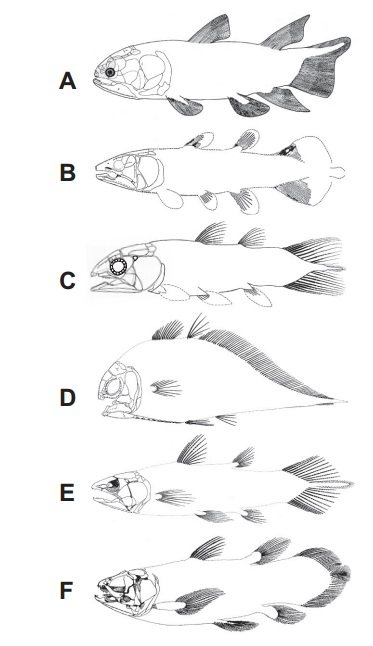
A, Miguashaia bureaui, Shultze, 1973, Upper Devonian (Frasnian), Migausha, Canada; B, Diplocercides heiligostockiensis, Jessen (1966), Upper Devonian (Frasnian), Bergisch-Gladbach, Germany; C, Serenicthys kowiensis, Upper Devonian (Famennian), Grahamstown, South Africa; D, Allenypterus montanus Melton 1969, Lower Carboniferous (Namurian), Montana, USA; E, Rhabdodema elegans, (Newberry, 1856), Upper Carboniferous (Westphalian), Linton, Ohio, USA; F, Latimeria chalumnae Smith 1939, extant, east coast of Africa.

According to the authors it is the Devonian coelacanth most similar to the hypothetical ancestor of modern coelacanths – its fossil remains lie a mere 100 km from the mouth of the Chalumna River, where Latimeria chalumnae was first found in 1938. In keeping with the use of river names, 'kowiensis' is after the Kowie River which has its headwaters in the hills surrounding the site, while 'Serenichthys' honours Serena Gess, who provided storage space for some 70 tons of fossil-bearing black shale.

Coelacanths are thought to have originated in the Devonian, 419.2 ± 3.2 million years ago. Five species of reconstructable coelacanth were previously known from this period, and were found in North America, Europe, China and Australia. At the time these fossils formed in an estuary adjacent to the semi-enclosed Agulhas Sea, Africa was still part of Gondwana, together with India, Australia, Antarctica and South America. All the whole impressions found were of juveniles, suggesting that S. kowiensis was using this shallow estuary as a nursery, behaviour still seen in modern fish. The extant coelacanth, Latimeria, bears live young, but whether these also congregate in nurseries is as yet unknown. This site becomes the earliest known coelacanth nursery, predating Rhabdoderma exiguum in the 300 million-year-old Mazon Creek beds of Illinois.

== Description abstract ==
"A new coelacanth genus from the Famennian (Upper Devonian) of South Africa is described, principally from presumed juveniles. Serenichthys kowiensis gen. et sp. nov. uniquely shares with Diplocercides a ventral expansion of the elbow-like lachrymojugal, as well as a symmetrical diphycercal tail supported by expanded neural and haemal spines and radials. Serenichthys is distinguished from Diplocercides by a number of derived characters, including possession of longer anterior parietals, a more crescent-shaped postorbital with a more anteriorly positioned infraorbital canal, and a far smaller squamosal, which is well separated from the skull roof. By contrast, Serenichthys appears to lacks a second dorsal fin lobe, a derived feature present in Diplocercides. Most specimens of Serenichthys are between 3 and 6 cm in length. They have large eyes, and dermal bones of the skull ornamented with long wavy ridges, similar to the dermal ornament of other Devonian coelacanths such as Gavinia. Larger isolated operculae also collected from the Waterloo Farm locality and attributed to Serenichthys indicate that with growth the ridges on the dermal bones transformed into elongate tubercles, reminiscent of those of Diplocercides and Carboniferous taxa. Phylogenetic analysis resolves Serenichthys as the sister group of Holopterygius and all known post-Devonian coelacanths. The clade including the unusual leaf-shaped coelacanths, the Devonian Holopterygius and Carboniferous Allenypterus, branches from the coelacanth lineage immediately crownward of Serenichthys. The presence of abundant juveniles within an estuarine setting strongly parallels the discovery of similarly sized juveniles of Rhabdoderma exiguus together with eggs and yolk-sack larvae in the Upper Carboniferous Mazon Creek biota. It is therefore argued that Serenichthys, like Rhabdoderma, was using the sheltered estuarine environment as a nursery."

— Zoological Journal of the Linnean Society, 2015, 175, 360–383

== See also ==
- Priscomyzon
- Gondwanascorpio emzantsiensis
