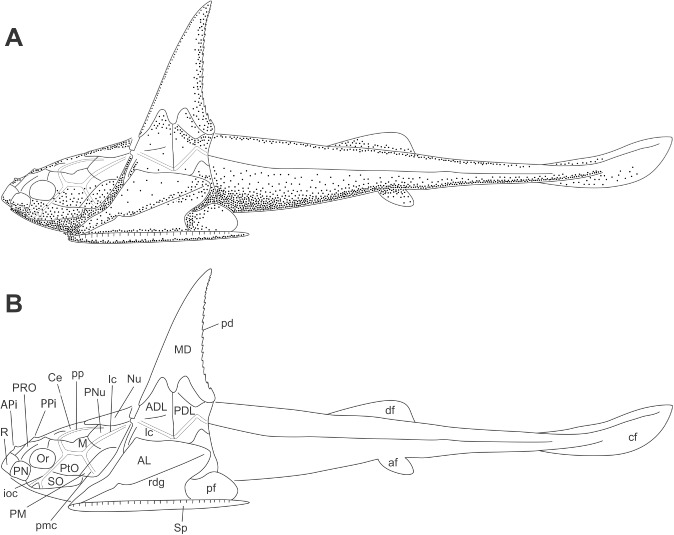
- Reconstruction of A. doryssa
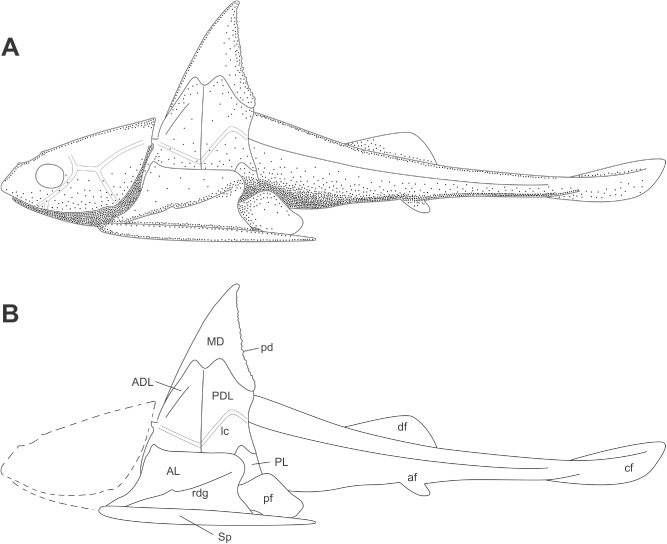
- Reconstruction of A. edmountaini

Scientific classification
- Kingdom: Animalia
- Phylum: Chordata
- Class: †Placodermi
- Order: †Arthrodira
- Family: †Groenlandaspididae
- Genus: †Africanaspis; Long et al., 1997

Type species
- Africanaspis doryssa Long et al., 1997

Other species
- Africanaspis edmountaini Gess & Trinajstic, 2017

= Africanaspis =

Africanaspis Temporal range: Late Devonian, Famennian

Extinct genus of placoderm from Late Devonian South Africa

Africanaspis is an extinct genus of groenlandaspidid placoderm known from two species, Africanaspis doryssa, named in 1997 from fossils discovered in South Africa and Africanaspis edmountaini, named from fossils described from South Africa during 2017. A. edmountaini is only known from juvenile specimens. Both species are known from the Witpoort Formation. A. doryssa reached 23 cm (9.1 in) long.
