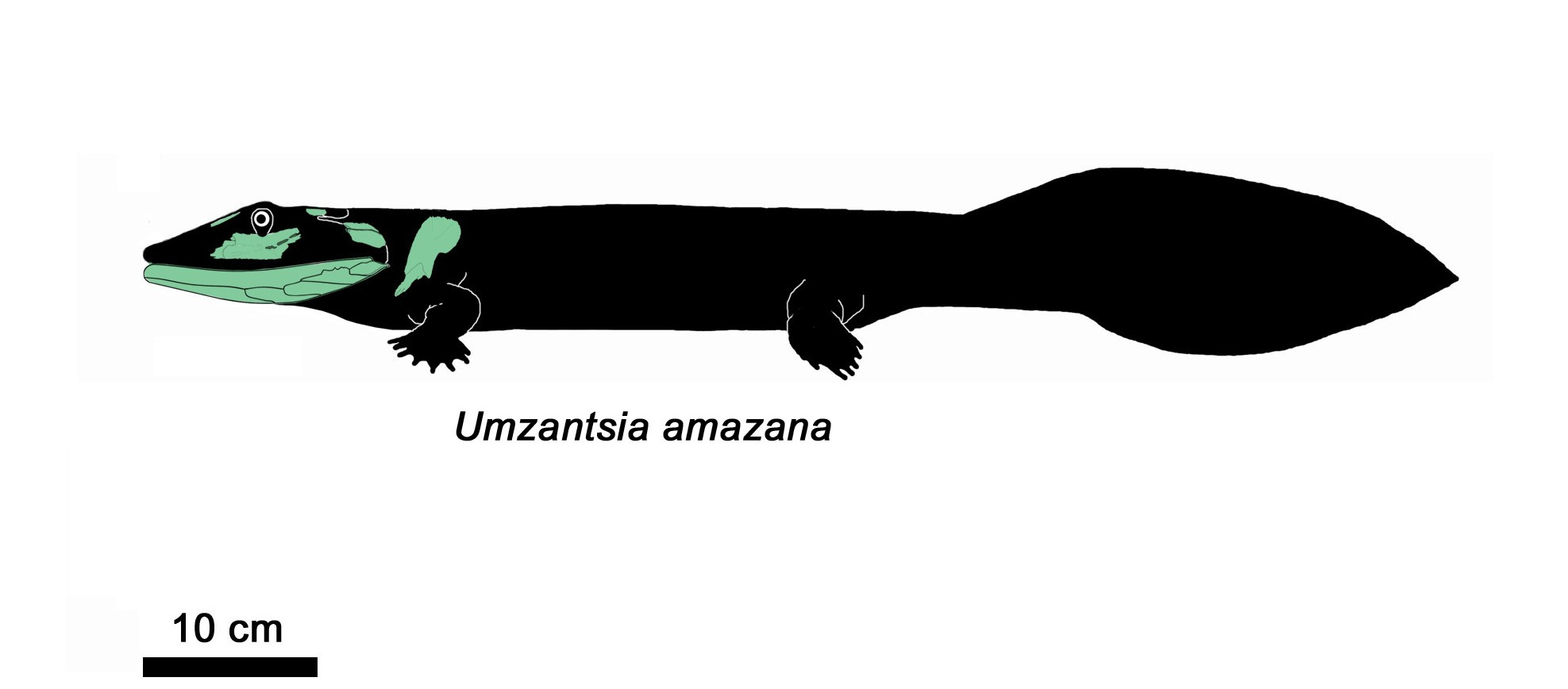
- Reconstructed outline

Scientific classification
- Domain: Eukaryota
- Kingdom: Animalia
- Phylum: Chordata
- Clade: Sarcopterygii
- Clade: Tetrapodomorpha
- Clade: Stegocephali
- Genus: †Umzantsia; Gess & Alberg, 2018

Type species
- †Umzantsia amazana Gess & Ahlberg, 2018

= Umzantsia =

Umzantsia Temporal range: Late Devonian, 360 Ma

Extinct genus of limbed stegocephalians from the Devonian of South Africa

Umzantsia is an extinct genus of limbed stegocephalians ('tetrapods', in the broad sense) from the Devonian of South Africa. It contains a single species, Umzantsia amazana. The genus is based on ~360 million year old skull and shoulder bones from the Waterloo Farm lagerstätte, a locality on the south-eastern coast of South Africa. In the Devonian, this area of Gondwana was located within the Antarctic Circle. Together with the find of Tutusius umlambo from the same locality, this provides the first evidence that Devonian limbed vertebrates were not restricted to the tropics as was formerly believed, and suggests that they may have been global in distribution. Waterloo Farm fossils have been metamorphosed and intensely flattened, with the bone tissue replaced by secondary metamorphic mica that is partially altered to kaolinite and chlorite during uplift. They also provide the first evidence of Devonian limbed vertebrates from the continent of Africa, and only the second and third such taxa from Gondwana.

== Etymology ==
The generic name is derived from isiXhosa “uMzantsi”, meaning “south” (also “South Africa”), referring to its place of origin. The specific name “amazana” means “water ripples”, referring to its distinctive dermal ornament.

== Description ==
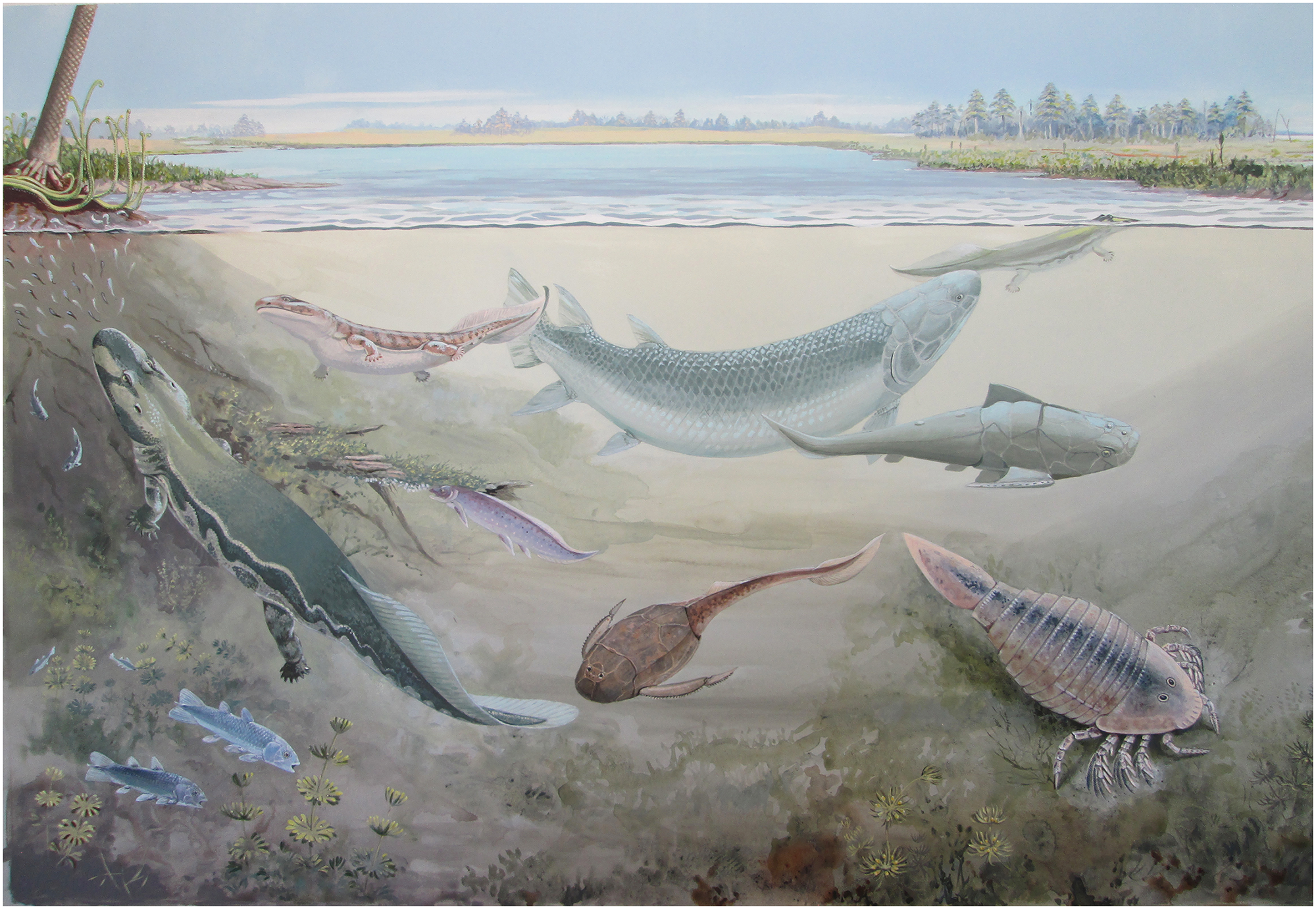
Reconstruction of paleoenvironment of Waterloo Farm, including two stegocephalians Tutusius and Umzantsia

Dermal bones of Umzantsia carry a distinctive ornamentation consisting of fine parallel ridges reminiscent of water ripples. This allows the identification of a number of cranial bones and a cleithrum from one bedding plane which are probably derived from a single individual. The dermal ornamentation covers about 80% of the cleithrum of Umzantsia; this fishlike characteristic contrasts with the un-ornamented cleithra of most other Devonian limbed vertebrates, suggesting a phylogenetic position transitional between proper limbed vertebrates (traditionally called tetrapods) and more basal taxa such as Tiktaalik. The only other contemporary 'tetrapod' with dermal ornamentation on the cleithrum is Parmastega, though ornamentation covers far less of the cleithrum in that taxon. The cleithrum tapers to a point anteroventrally and carries a single attachment scar for the scapulocoracoid, which extends along the anteroventral process, forms a v-shaped dorsal peak, and ends posteriorly in a projecting buttress. The blade of the cleithrum carries a semicircular posterodorsal extension. The jugal (cheek bone beneath the eye) extends anterior to the orbit and contacts the prefrontal. The jugal has a very short orbital margin and lacks a distinct dorsal postorbital process. A decayed lower jaw from a different individual of the same species was also described.
