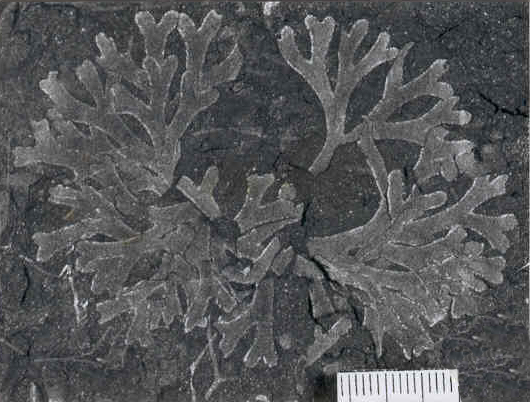
- Hungerfordia fionae

Scientific classification
- Kingdom: Plantae
- Genus: †Hungerfordia; Fry and Banks, 1955

Type species
- Hungerfordia dichotoma Fry and Banks, 1955

= Hungerfordia (alga) =

Hungerfordia Temporal range: 383.7–360.7 Ma

Extinct genus of algae

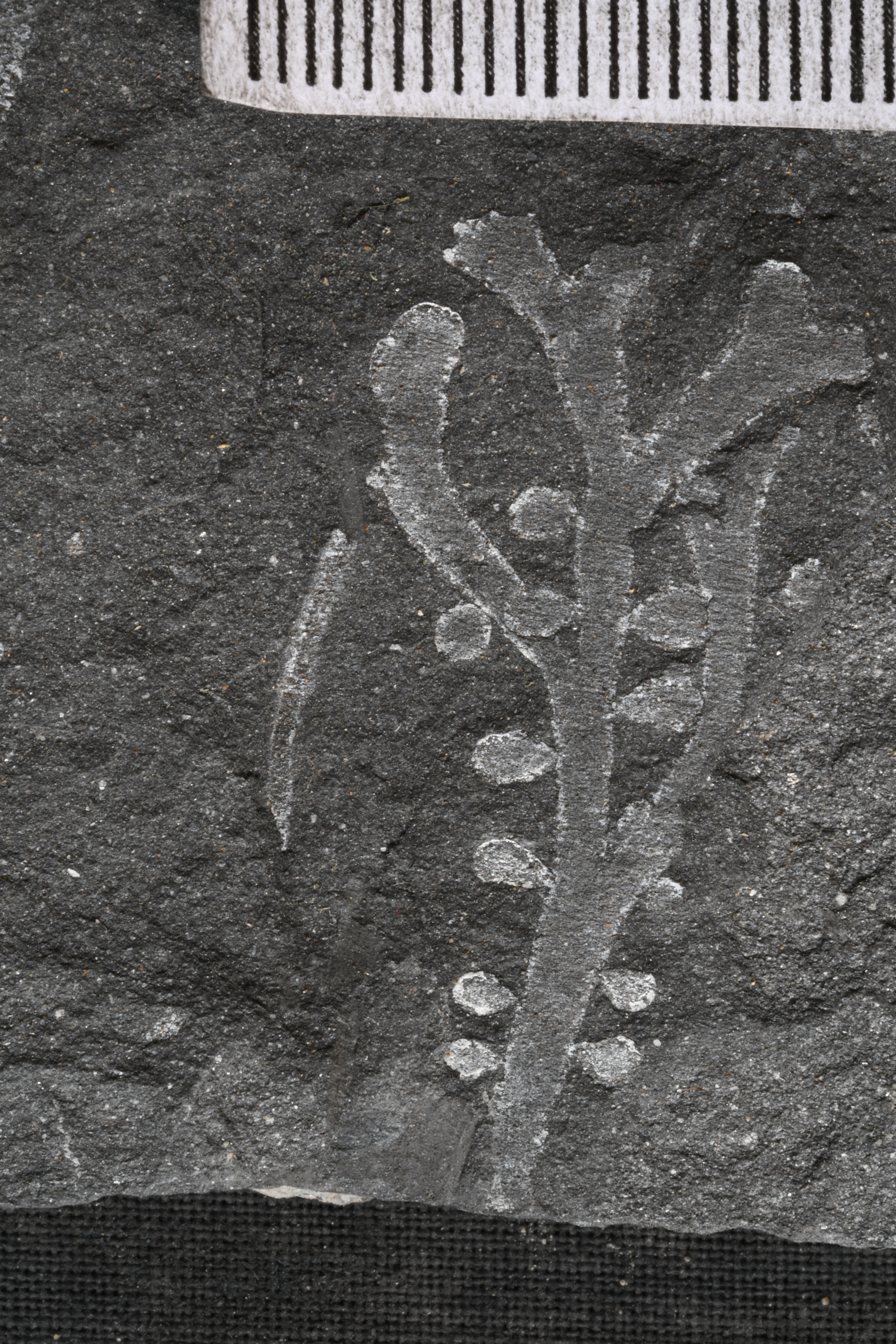
Hungerfordia fionae showing the characteristic buds

Hungerfordia is a genus of presumed marine algae first described by Fry and Banks in 1955 in describing Hungerfordia dichotoma from Late Devonian strata. It has been interpreted as a probable brown (Phaeophyte) algae though the possibility that it represents a red (Rhodophyte) alga is not excluded - the taxonomic challenge being that modern red and brown algae are differentiated on the basis of colour and cellular structure which are not preserved in the fossil taxa (Hiller and Gess, 1996, Gess and Whitfield). Douglas and Jell (1985) suggested that Buthotrephis trichotoma and B. divaricata should furthermore be transferred from Buthotrephis to Hungerfordia.

A further species, Hungerfordia fionae from the Late Devonian of South Africa is known from the largest sample, analysis of which suggests that variations used to differentiate between H. dichotoma and H. trichotoma may represent growth variations accountable by a single taxon. Hungerfordia fionae fossils are as yet only recorded from the Waterloo Farm lagerstätte in Makhanda, Eastern Cape, South Africa and were first mentioned in the literature in 1991 as ‘terminally-lobed algae’ by Fiona Taylor. With further excavations, in subsequent years, hundreds of specimens of Hungerfordia have been collected, which are housed within the Devonian Ecosystems Laboratory, Albany Museum in Makhanda, Eastern Cape - (with further good examples still being added to the collection during ongoing excavations (2021) by the research team of the Devonian Ecosystems Project). Hungerfordia fionae comprises dichotomous axes and is differentiated from other species by the presence of small bud-like appendages along the margins, which are preserved in a minority of specimens, and may more commonly have been shed in life or during transport. These have been compared to buds produced during the fertile phase of modern Rhodophyte algae. It is believed that H. fionae probably lived in the more marine dominated portion of the Waterloo Farm estuarine system and were drifted further into the estuarine lake system through tidal action. Here they were preserved in large numbers due to anoxic bottom water and still water conditions that allowed for unusual preservation of soft tissues. They are often preserved alongside charophyte algae, representative of fresh to brack conditions, demonstrating the dynamic salinity clines in the estuarine environment, as well as fragments of terrestrial plants and estuarine fauna.

== Description ==
Hungerfordia fionae can be characterised by its thalloid branches with rounded ends that bear bud-like enations (or outgrowths) around the margins. The specimens have an average size of 60 mm long and 60 – 65 mm wide. Despite being incomplete, specimens suggest a four-frond structure emerging from two closely spaced initial bifurcations. The branches are 3–4 mm with bifurcations that occur at irregular intervals and often about 15 mm apart but sometimes at negligible or even greater intervals. The number of bifurcations can be up to seven. One feature that sets Hungerfordia fionae apart from other similar species is the presence of circular bud-like features that are believed to be reproductive structures.
