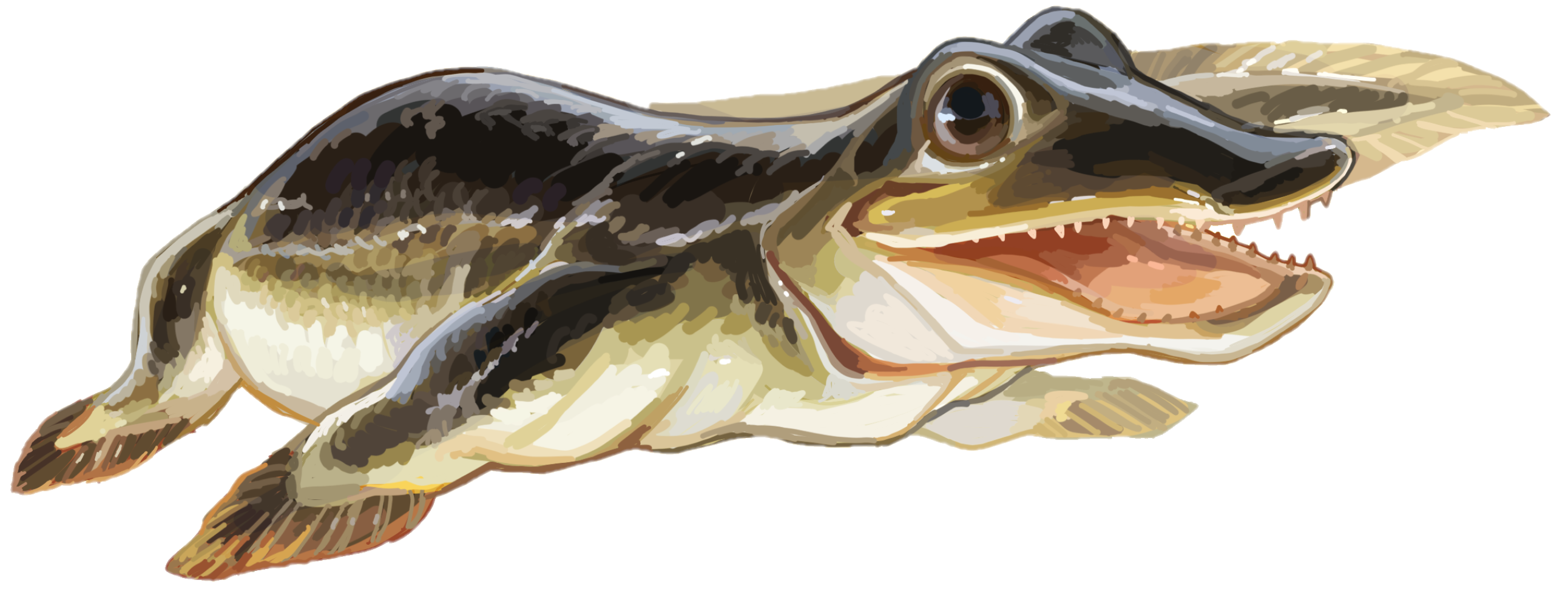
- Artist's reconstruction of P. aelidae

Scientific classification
- Kingdom: Animalia
- Phylum: Chordata
- Clade: Stegocephali
- Genus: †Parmastega; Beznosov et al., 2019

Type species
- †Parmastega aelidae Beznosov et al., 2019

= Parmastega =

Parmastega Temporal range: Late Devonian, 372 Ma

Extinct genus of tetrapodomorphs

Parmastega is an extinct genus of stem tetrapod from the Devonian, dated to the earliest Famennian age (about 372 million years ago), in contrast to later fossils known from late Famennian (365–359 million years ago). These later fossils are considerably younger, by about 30 million years, than the earliest recorded tetrapod footprints, which presented a mystery that Parmastega's more recently described morphology from a three dimensional reconstruction has helped provide insight on.

One remaining mystery is what exactly it hunted. There were large invertebrates on land, but they were not necessarily common. It is remotely possible it hunted other shore-resting early amphibians, but more speculative. It is also possible it hunted sea scorpions that were comfortable on both land and sea.

== Etymology ==
The generic name Parmastega is derived from the Komi word parma, a term describing the forested hill landscape typical of the region in which the fossils were discovered, and stégi, the Greek for roof referring to the roof of the skull.

== Description ==
Parmastega's maximum length is estimated to be around 130 centimeters (4 feet). Its eyes are positioned on the top of its head similarly to modern-day crocodilians, indicating that it likely spent a lot of time looking out above the water's surface while the rest of its body stayed submerged. It possesses sharp teeth including a pair of fangs and rows of marginal teeth on adsymphysial plate, which together would have made it a capable ambush hunter along the water's edge. The question of what exactly it was hunting remains a mystery, as large terrestrial invertebrates were not unheard of, but still rare at the time.

Parmastega made its home in shallow freshwater lagoons in what is now Russia. Like other basal Stegocephalians, it breathed primarily through gills, possessing low-lying nostrils that would have remained submerged to drive water to the gills. In addition, it also had a spiracle on the top of its head for breathing air in poorly oxygenated or otherwise poor water conditions, not unlike modern Teleosts using a labyrinth organ in a similar fashion.

== See also ==
- Tiktaalik
- Ichthyostega
- Acanthostega
