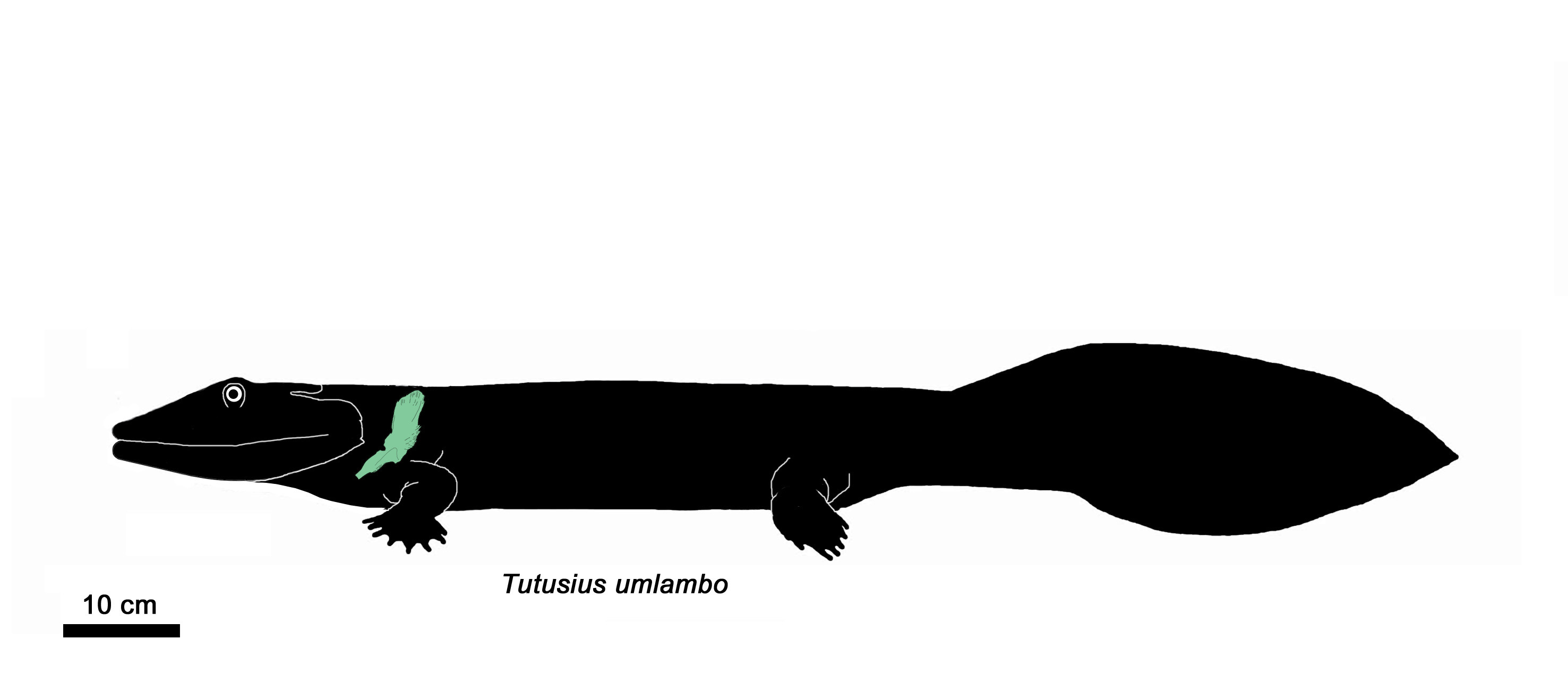
- Reconstructed outline

Scientific classification
- Domain: Eukaryota
- Kingdom: Animalia
- Phylum: Chordata
- Clade: Sarcopterygii
- Clade: Tetrapodomorpha
- Clade: Stegocephali
- Genus: †Tutusius; Gess & Alberg, 2018

Type species
- †Tutusius umlambo Gess & Ahlberg, 2018

= Tutusius =

Tutusius Temporal range: Late Devonian, 360 Ma

Genus of extinct tetrapod from the Devonian of South Africa

Tutusius is a genus of extinct tetrapod from the Devonian of South Africa, containing a single species, Tutusius umlambo. It was described from the +/- 360 myo Gondwana locality of Waterloo Farm lagerstätte on the south-eastern coast of South Africa, which at the time was located within the Antarctic Circle. Together with the find of Umzantsia amazana from the same locality, this provides the first evidence that Devonian tetrapods were not restricted to the tropics as was formerly believed, and suggests that they may have been global in distribution. Waterloo Farm fossils have been metamorphosed and intensely flattened, with the bone tissue replaced by secondary metamorphic mica that is partially altered to kaolinite and chlorite during uplift. They also provide the first evidence of Devonian tetrapods from the continent of Africa, and only the second and third such taxa from Gondwana.

== Taxonomy ==
Tutusius umlambo is known from a single cleithrum (a bone of the shoulder girdle) discovered at the Waterloo Farm lagerstätte, South Africa. It was described in 2018 by palaeontologists Robert Gess and Per Erik Ahlberg in 2018. The generic name is in honour of Archbishop Desmond Tutu, in recognition of his contribution to the political and social development of South Africa. The specific name is from isiXhosa “umlambo”, meaning “river”, referring to the depositional environment. The lagerstätte dates to the Late Devonian roughly 360 million years ago.

Tutusius, along with Umzantsia from the same lagerstätte, are the first evidence of Devonian tetrapods beyond 30° in latitude from the equator and on the supercontinent Gondwana (except for a single body fossil and footprint from what is now Australia). The lagerstätte would have been in the south polar region, and the two genera demonstrate early tetrapods were not restricted to the warm tropics. They also make it possible that the transition from fish to tetrapod occurred at the poles instead of the tropics.

== Description ==
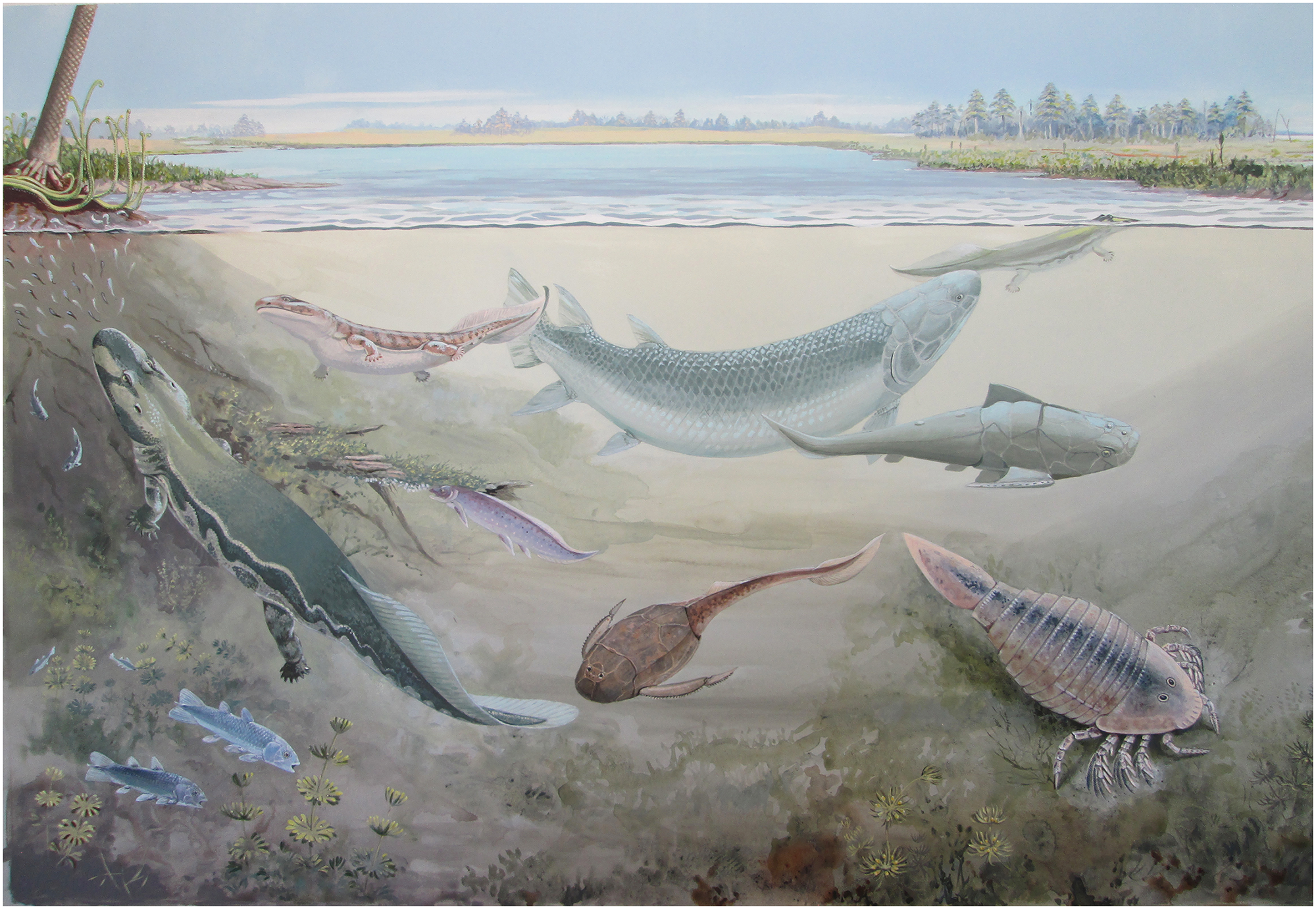
Reconstruction of paleoenvironment of Waterloo Farm, including two stegocephalians Tutusius and Umzantsia

Tutusius is represented by a single bone from the shoulder girdle, the cleithrum. It tapers to a point anteroventrally and carries a single attachment scar for the scapulocoracoid, which extends along the anteroventral process, forms a v-shaped dorsal peak, and ends posteriorly in a projecting buttress. The cleithrum lacks ornament and has a distinct flexure point delineating the obliquely sloping ventral half of the bone from the more vertical dorsal half. The blade of the cleithrum is broad and thin. It differs from all other tetrapod cleithra in the presence of a projecting posterior flange with striated texture and a jagged margin, on the middle part of the blade.
