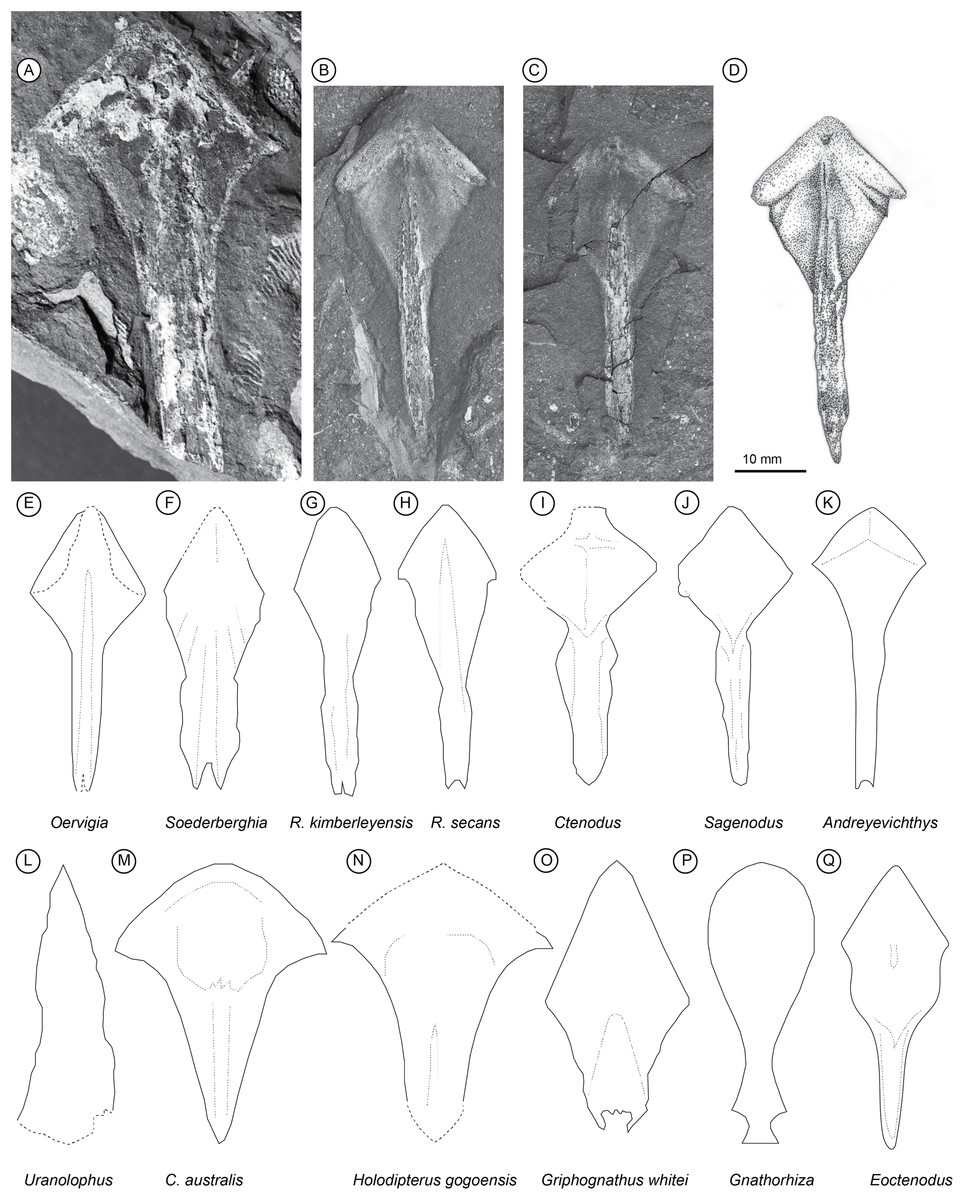
- Parasphenoid material (A-D) compared to other fossil lungfish
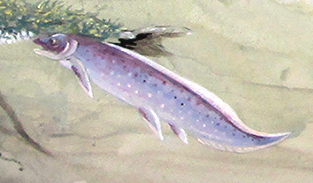
- Life restoration

Scientific classification
- Kingdom: Animalia
- Phylum: Chordata
- Class: Dipnoi
- Genus: †Isityumzi; Gess & Clement, 2019
- Species: †I. mlomomde

Binomial name
- †Isityumzi mlomomde Gess & Clement, 2019

= Isityumzi =

Isityumzi Temporal range: Famennian

Extinct genus of lungfish

Isityumzi mlomomde is fossil lungfish described from fragmentary remains including one complete parasphenoid, tooth plates fragments and scales from the Late Devonian Sarcopterygians (lobe finned fishes). It represents the only record of Late Devonian lungfish remains from western Gondwana.

This novel species was described through an international collaboration from the Waterloo Farm lagerstätte in the former Grahamstown (Makhanda) of the Eastern Cape province, South Africa. The type material for this genus was excavated from a layer of black metashale located in a predominantly arenaceous Witpoort Formation corresponding to the Famennian age.

Lungfish are believed to have solely originated from tropical to warm temperate regions, however, evidence from the Isityumzi mlomomde adds a bigger circle of information to the current perception as evidence from these now suggests that lungfishes originated from the high palaeolatitude fauna located at 70° latitude and possibly further south. This was the position of now Waterloo Farm lagerstätte in what was once Gondwana landmass.

Isityumzi mlomomde is further believed to have coexisted with the tetrapods of the Famennian in an estuarine ecosystem environment as seen through the Waterloo Farm lagerstätte's geological lens.

== Description ==
To date, two parasphenoid bones have been found in Waterloo Farm, one partial and the other (latest) complete. The current description is mainly based on the complete specimen found with other fragments, as the incomplete one has already been described previously.

The parasphenoid of the Isityumzi mlomomde is thin and flat, not fused with the pterygoids but shows a clear area for overlap by these bones. The size difference across the widest point between the holotype and the partial parasphenoid is 16 mm (0.63 in), with the former being smaller. The anterior part is wide, with almost half the entire length of the total specimen. The parasphenoid has a distinctly broad rhombic anterior portion (corpus) and a narrow posterior shaft. The shaft is slender with parallel sides that taper to a single point posteriorly. The lateral angle between the stalk and the corpus is 30°. A long median ridge runs anteroposteriorly carrying a broad channel across the length of the stalk but it is unclear whether or not this lies on the dorsal or ventral surface. The overall appearance of the bones resembles those of Oervigia.

== Etymology ==
The genus name Isityumzi is derived from the IsiXhosa language meaning 'device for crushing'. The species epithet mlomomde is also an IsiXhosa name meaning 'long mouthed'.
