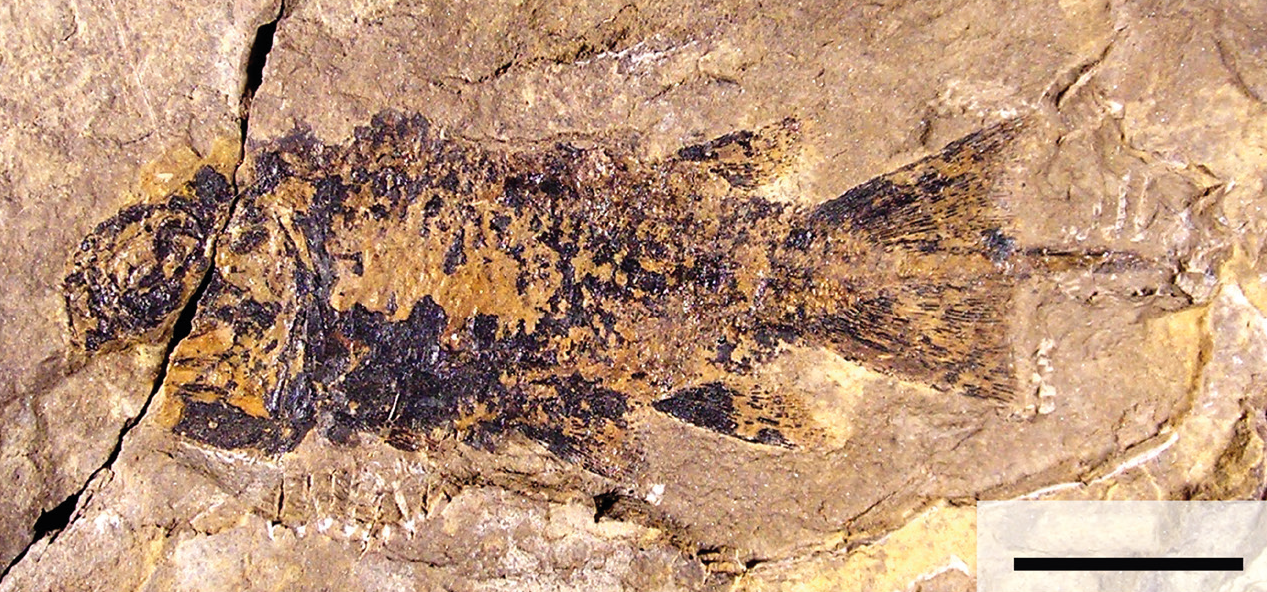
- Body fossil of S. walteri
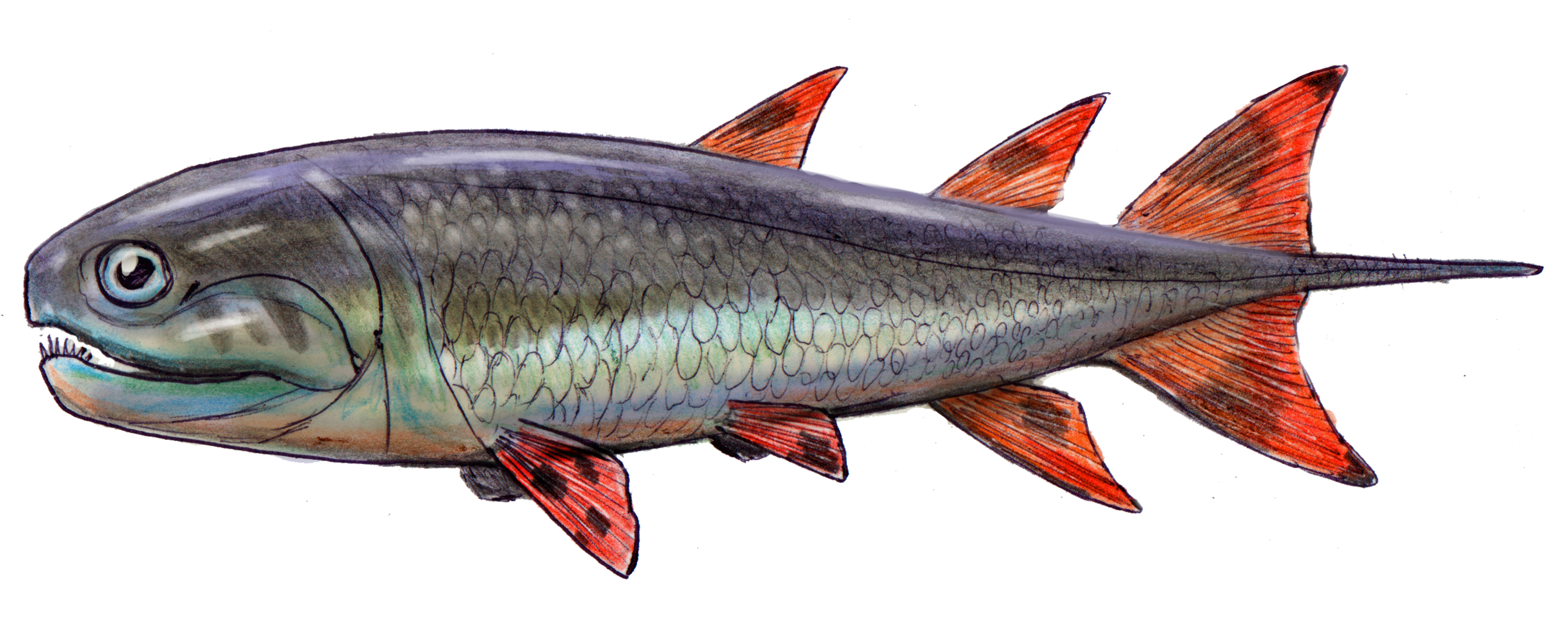
- Artist's restoration of S. rolandi

Scientific classification
- Kingdom: Animalia
- Phylum: Chordata
- Order: †Onychodontiformes
- Family: †Onychodontidae (?)
- Genus: †Strunius; Gross, 1956

Type species
- †Strunius rolandi Gross, 1956

Species
- †S. rolandi (Gross, 1956); †S. walteri (Jessen, 1966); 1 unnamed species

= Strunius =

Strunius Temporal range: Late Devonian Frasnian

Extinct genus of lobe finned fish

Strunius is an extinct genus of lobe-finned fish from the Late Devonian period of Germany and Latvia. The genus contains two named species, S. rolandi and S. walteri, as well as a third unnamed species from the Lode Quarry of Latvia.

== Description ==
Although it was a lobe-finned fish, Strunius' fins were supported by fin rays and appear closer in form to those of ray-finned fish. However, its skull was composed of two articulating halves, a feature characteristic of the lobe-finned rhipidistians. The skull was also divided by a deep articulation, with both halves probably connected by a large muscles, increasing the strength of the animal's bite. The same system is seen in coelacanths and the better-known genus Eusthenopteron.

Compared to other lobe-finned fishes, Strunius had a rather short, stubby body, and was just 10 centimetres (4 in) long. It was covered in large, round, bony scales, and probably fed on other fishes.
