= Zeller =

Zeller, meaning both prisoner and monk in German, may refer to:

== Places ==
- Zeller Ache, a river of Upper Austria
- Zeller Bach (Isar), a river of Bavaria, Germany, tributary of the Isar
- Zeller Bach (Memminger Ach), a river of Bavaria, Germany, tributary of the Kressenbach (upper course of the Memminger Ach)
- Zeller Bach (Irrsee), a river of the Salzkammergut, Upper Austria, tributary of the Irrsee
- Zeller Blauen (more rarely: Hochblauen), a mountain in the southern Black Forest in Germany
- Zeller See, various lakes in Austria and Germany
  - Zeller See (Lake Constance), part of Lower Lake Constance, Baden-Württemberg, Germany
  - Lake Zell, a lake in the Pinzgau near Zell am See, Zell am See District, state of Salzburg, Austria
  - Zeller See or Irrsee, a lake in the Salzkammergut near Zell am Moos, Vöcklabruck District, Upper Austria, Austria
- Zeller Glacier, glacier in Antarctica
- Zeller Horn, a mountain of Baden-Württemberg, Germany
- Zeller Valley, a valley in the Bavarian Forest in southern Germany

== People ==
- Zeller (surname)

== In fiction ==
- Sniper rifle in the 2006 computer game Battlefield 2142
- Herr Zeller, the Gauleiter, in both The Sound of Music, musical and movie
- Julie Zeller in the play "Liliom", which was the basis for Carousel (musical)

== Other uses ==
- Heinrich Zeller House, also known as Fort Zeller and Zeller's Fort, is a historic 1 1/2-story building that has served as a fort, block house and residence. The historic structure is located in Millcreek Township, Lebanon County, Pennsylvania
- Jo Zeller Racing, a Swiss motor racing team
- Zeller's congruence, an algorithm to calculate the day of the week for any Julian or Gregorian calendar date.
- Zeller (company), an Australian financial services and digital payments company headquartered in Melbourne, Australia.
