= Zeller Bach =

Zeller Bach may refer to:

- Zeller Bach (Isar), a river of Bavaria, Germany, tributary of the Isar
- Zeller Bach (Memminger Ach), a river of Bavaria, Germany, tributary of the Kressenbach (upper course of the Memminger Ach)
- Zeller Bach (Irrsee), a river of the Salzkammergut, Upper Austria, tributary of the Irrsee
