= Zoller =

Zoller is a surname. Notable people with the surname include:

- Attila Zoller (1927–1998), the first guitarist to discover free jazz, innovator of modern jazz guitar
- Gunter Zoller (born 1948), German figure skater and figure skating coach
- Hans Zoller (1922–2020), Swiss bobsledder who competed in the 1950s and 1960s
- Heinrich Zoller (1923–2009), Swiss botanist
- Hugo Zoller (1852–1933), German explorer and journalist
- Israel (Eugenio) Zolli (1881–1956), born Israel Anton Zoller, Chief Rabbi of Rome, 1939–1945, and post-World War II convert to Catholicism
- Karl Zoller (born 1963), American golfer
- Karlheinz Zoller (1928–2005), German flautist, principal in the Berlin Philharmonic Orchestra
- Martha Zoller (born 1959), columnist, author, and radio personality on the new News-Talk 103
- Peter Zoller (born 1952), theoretical physicist from Austria
- Raviv Zoller, Israeli businessman
- Robert Zoller (born 1961), retired Austrian alpine skier
- Stefan Zoller (1914–1993), Romanian field handball player of German origin who competed in the 1936 Summer Olympics

== See also ==
- Zoller Glacier, glacier flowing north into the Ferrar Glacier of Victoria Land
- Zoller-Frasier Round Barn, historic round barn located at Newville in Herkimer County, New York
- Zaller
- Zeller (disambiguation)
- Ziller
- Zöller or Zoeller (disambiguation)
- Zoller supercharger created by Arnold Zoller
