= Attersee (lake) =

Lake in Austria

- Kammersee; Lake Atter
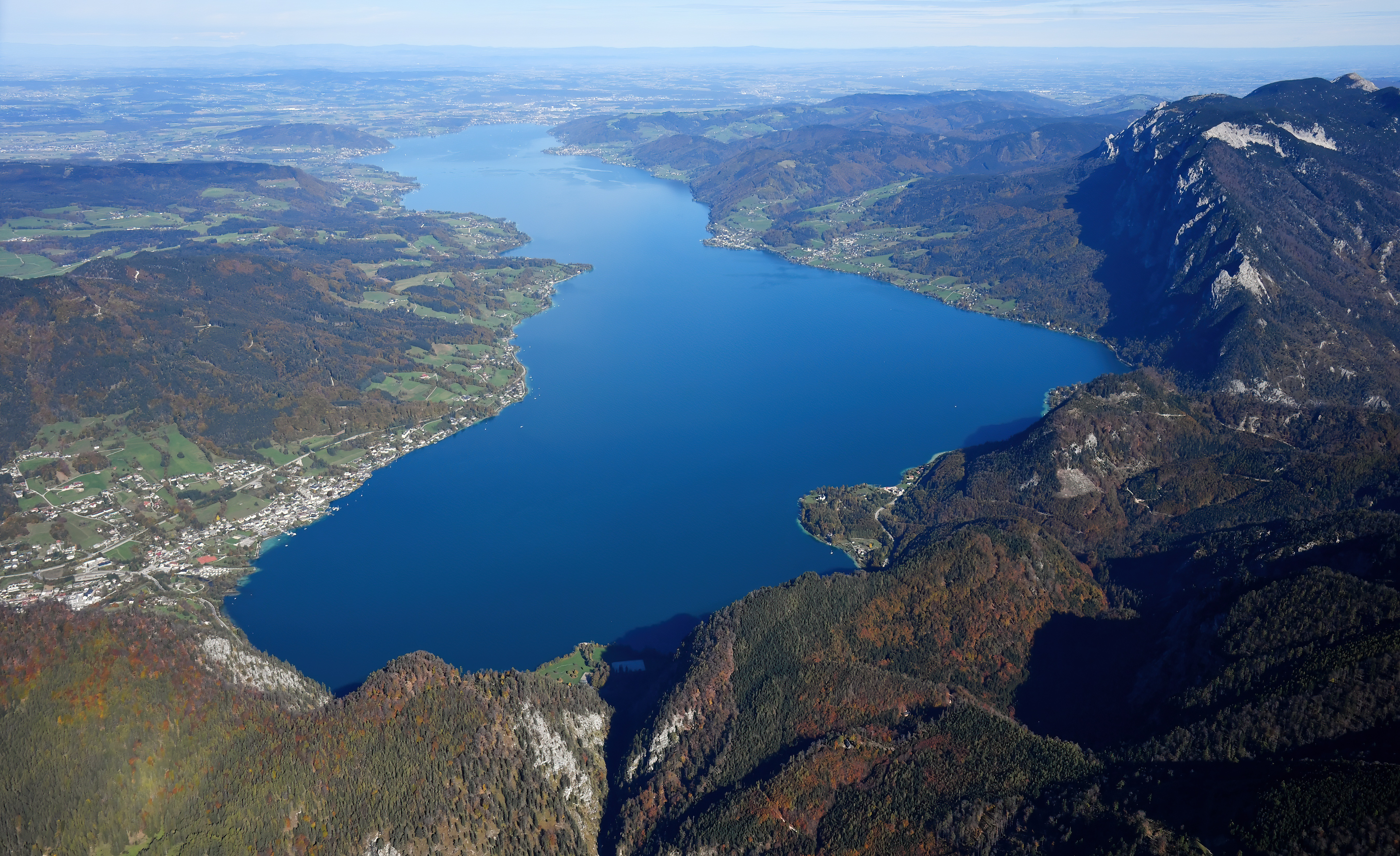

- Location within Austria
- Location: Salzkammergut, Austria, European Union
- Coordinates: 47°54′N 13°33′E
- Primary inflows: Seeache
- Primary outflows: Ager
- Catchment area: 464 km^{2} (179 sq mi)
- Basin countries: Austria
- Max. length: 18.9 km (11.7 mi)
- Max. width: 3.3 km (2.1 mi)
- Surface area: 46.2 km^{2} (17.8 sq mi)
- Average depth: 85 m (279 ft)
- Max. depth: 169 m (554 ft)
- Water volume: 3.943 km^{3} (0.946 cu mi)
- Surface elevation: 469.02 m.a.A. (1,538.8 ft)
- Islands: Litzlberg Castle
- Settlements: Seewalchen, Schörfling, Weyregg, Steinbach, Unterach, Nußdorf, Attersee

Attersee (less commonly also Kammersee, English sometimes Lake Atter) is a lake in the Upper Austrian part of the Salzkammergut, in the district of Vöcklabruck, and lies at an elevation of 469 metres above the Adriatic (m.a.A.) (1,539 feet). The outflow from Attersee passes through a weir into the Ager river, which flows via the Traun river into the Danube. This nutrient-poor lake, with its varied shorelines, provides habitats for many animal and plant species and has been designated a Natura 2000 site since 2006. With a water surface area of over 46 square kilometres (18 square miles), it is the largest lake situated entirely within Austria. At 169 m (554 ft), it is the second-deepest lake in Austria after neighbouring Traunsee, and with a water volume of almost 4 billion cubic metres (140 billion cubic feet), it is surpassed only by (the entire) Lake Constance. The Attersee is owned by the Austrian Federal Forests, is a major tourist destination in Upper Austria and a popular swimming lake, as well as a diving and sailing area. On the shores of the Attersee lie the remains of pile-dwelling settlements from the Neolithic, which form part of the UNESCO administered World Heritage Site known as "Prehistoric pile dwellings around the Alps".

== Geography ==
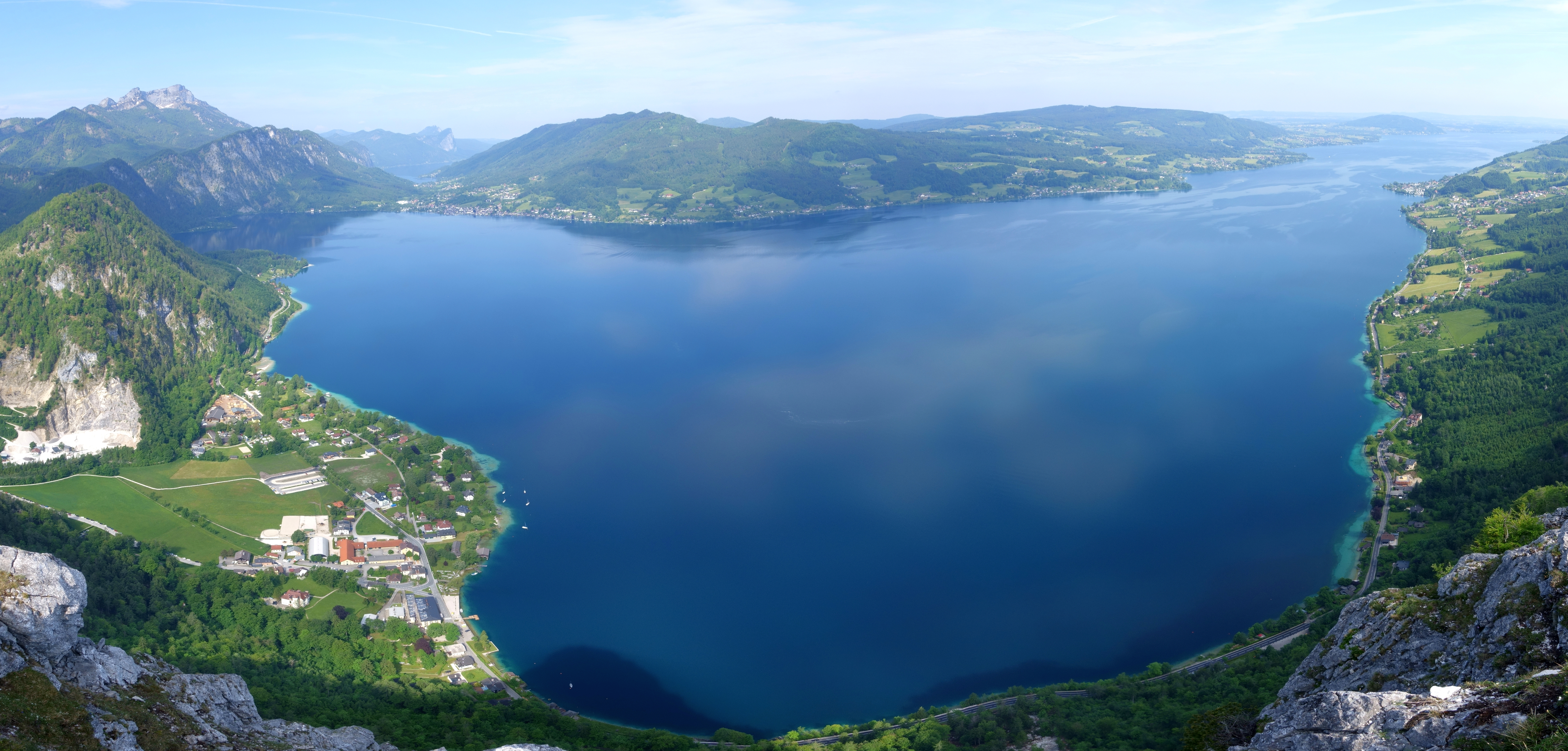
View from the Kleiner Schoberstein on the south-eastern shore. On the left is the settlement of Weißenbach am Attersee. In the background on the left is Mondsee lake

Attersee is situated in the Upper Austrian Salzkammergut region, in the district of Vöcklabruck. The larger towns on its shores are Seewalchen and Schörfling to the north, Weyregg and Steinbach to the east, and Unterach, Nußdorf and Attersee to the west. In addition to these municipalities, the municipality of Berg im Attergau also shares part of the lake’s surface area.

The lake, which stretches from north to south, is 18.9 kilometres (11.7 miles) long and has a maximum width of 3.3 km (2.1 mi). Its surface area is approximately 46.2 km^{2} (17.8 sq mi), and its average depth is 85 m (279 ft). The deepest point is given as 169 m (554 ft) in the official Austrian map. In 2014, divers reported discovering a point with a depth of 172.6 m (566 ft). The volume of water is 3,943 million m^{3} (139.2×10^{9} cu ft).

=== Shore ===
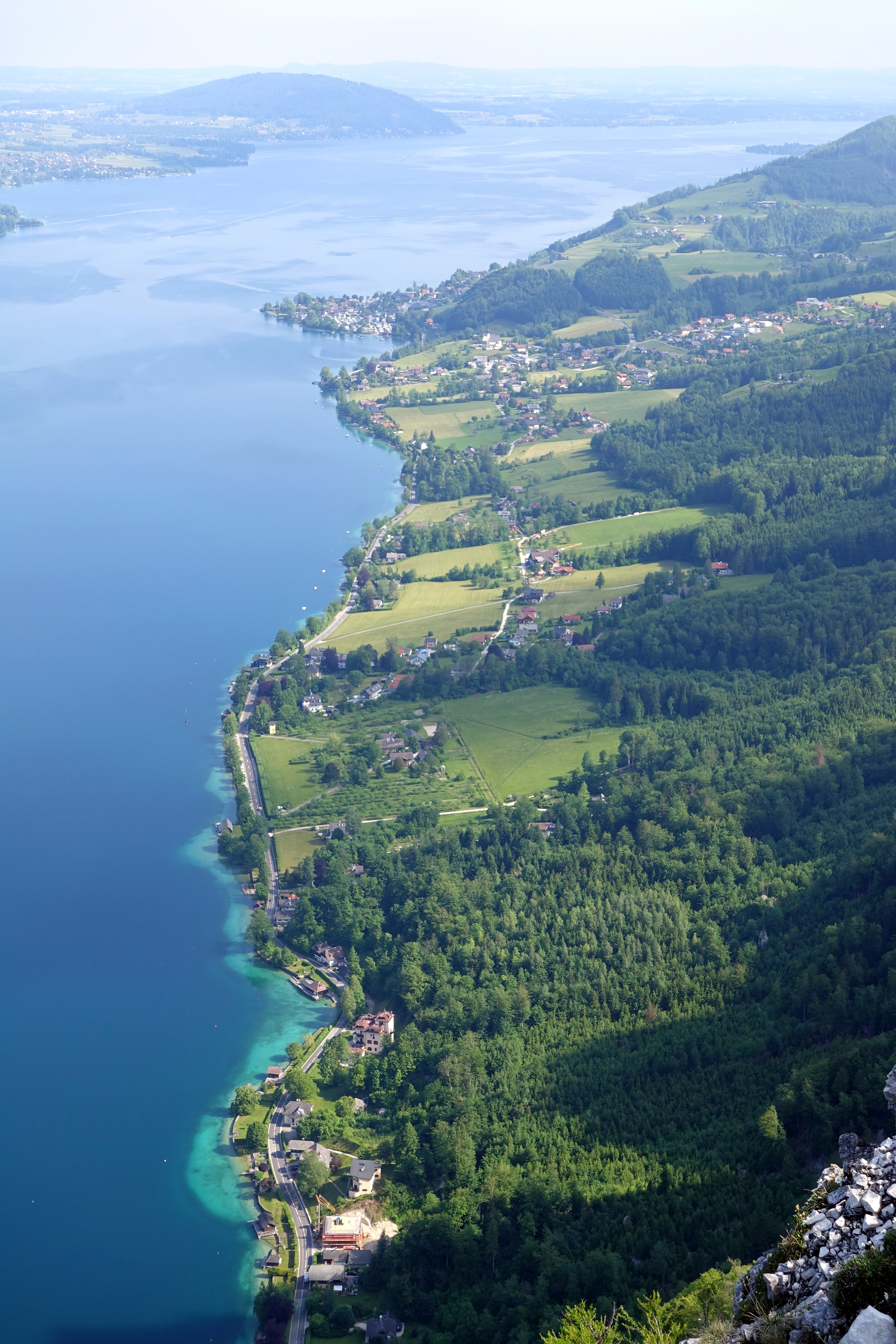
Southeastern shore of Attersee

The Attersee has a shoreline of 48.5 km (30.1 mi). The entire shoreline is heavily built-up, and the majority of it is privately owned and not open to the public. Many towns and villages on the Attersee have their town centres on the shore or close to it. There are church towns such as Weyregg am Attersee, as well as planned church towns such as Unterach and Steinbach. Scattered between the settlement centres are individual farms, small settlements and communities with residential and holiday homes. The lakeside areas were heavily developed in the 1970s and 1980s. Shops, restaurants, residential buildings and second homes line the shores. This has resulted in the shoreline being built up with jetties, boathouses, boat ramps, steps, walls, blockwork or rock fill. In those sections of the shoreline that are too steep for development, roads usually run alongside reinforced embankments that have replaced the natural shoreline. Around 87 per cent of the Attersee shoreline is significantly impaired. Particularly affected are the eastern shore, the northern shore and the northern part of the western shore, as well as the section between Misling and Unterach. Only 13 per cent can still be classified as near-natural or natural. The longest continuous natural sections are located between Dexelbach and Parschallen, between Aufham and Dickau, near Schwend and in Burgbachau.

=== Morphology ===
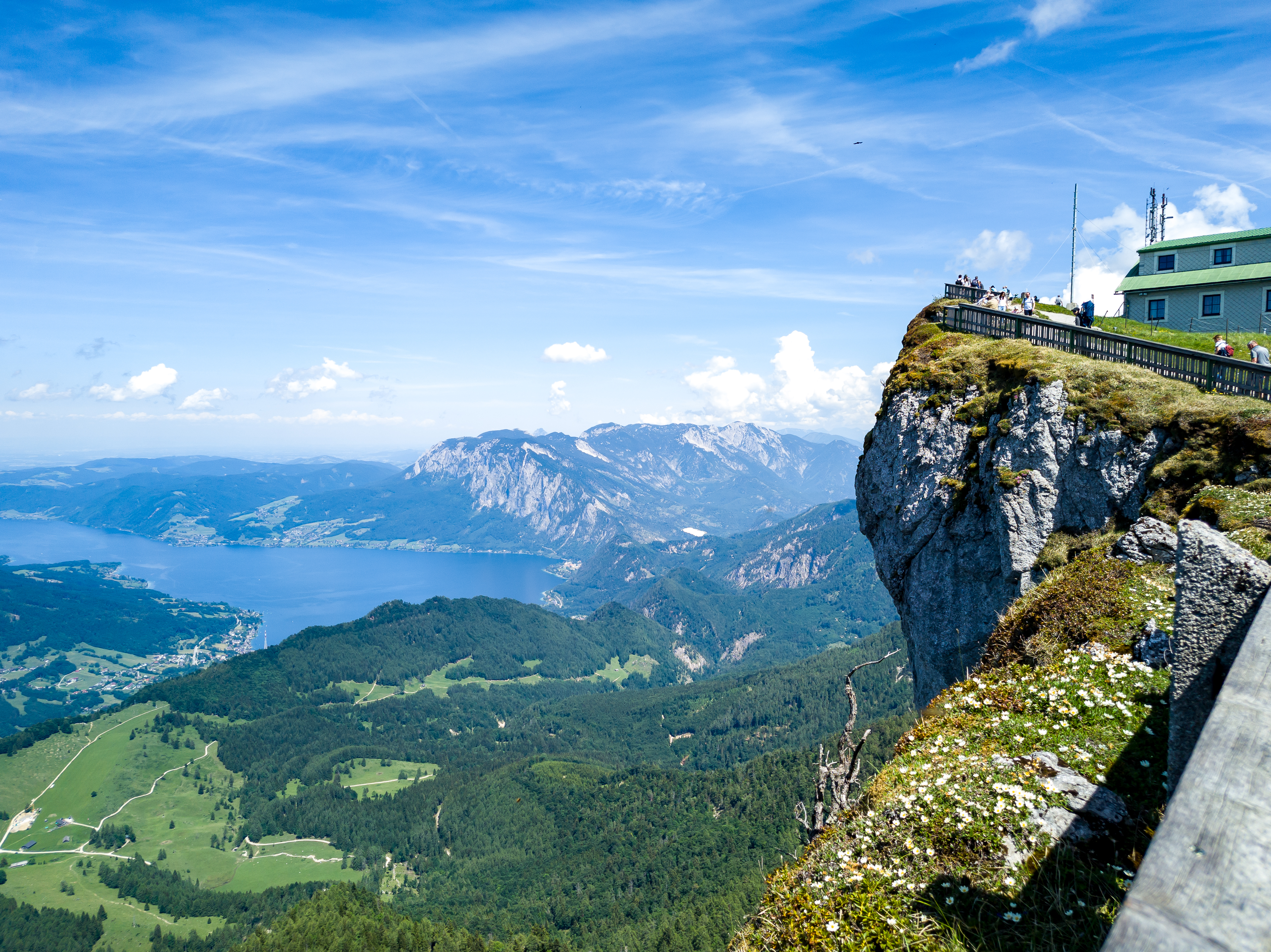
View of the Attersee from the Schafberg summit

On the southern shore lie the foothills of the Schafberg, whilst on the south-eastern shore, as far as Steinbach am Attersee, lies the western end of the Höllengebirge. The mountains there reach heights of between 900 and 1,100 m.a.A. (3,000 and 3,600 ft) and drop steeply down to the lake. Most of the eastern shore, as well as the entire western shore, is framed by wooded, gently sloping mountains and hills, which taper off at the northern edge.

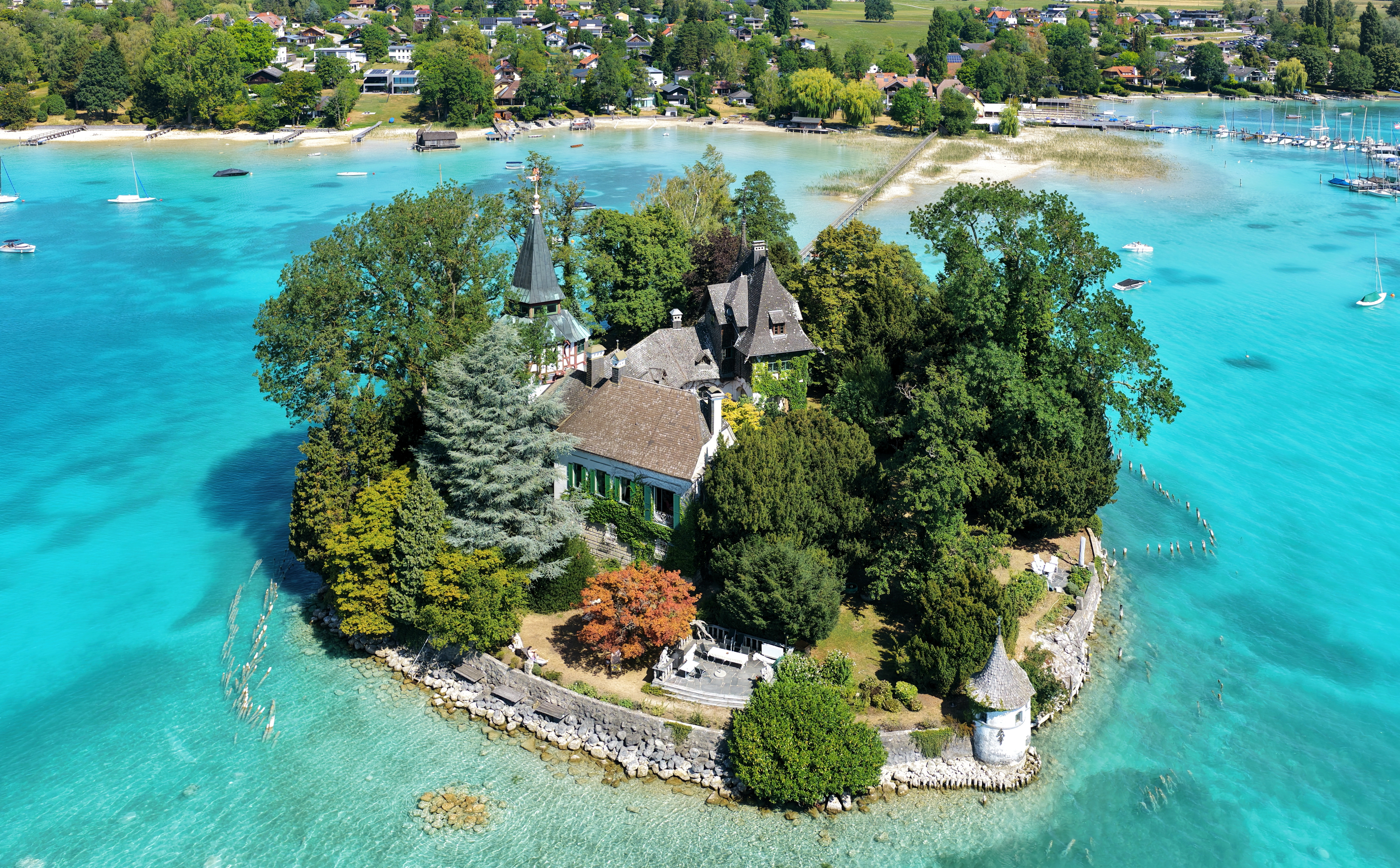
Litzlberg Castle is situated on the only remaining island in the lake

The lake basin is divided into three sub-basins: a southern basin, a central basin and a northern basin. The deepest point in the southern basin, at 169 m, is situated approximately 1 km (0.62 mi) north of Weißenbach am Attersee. It extends as far as the line between Stockwinkel and Seefeld. The central basin, which is up to 164 m (538 ft) deep, extends as far as the line between Nußdorf am Attersee and Alexenau. The underwater morphology is determined by the surrounding rock formations. Here and there, one finds buttes that have not been completely eroded. There are three prominent elevations in the central basin: an underwater mountain rising to a depth of around 12 m (39 ft), the A. Müller Peak and the Laichberg. The latter lies in the centre of the lake near the village of Nußdorf, in the middle of a basin 120 m (390 ft) deep, and rises to 49 m (161 ft) below the water’s surface. The shores on the eastern side are considerably steeper than those on the western side, as the Höllengebirge mountain range extends its rock faces underwater, as is the case at the Schwarze Brücke (trans. Black Bridge) near Seeleiten. The northern basin, which is up to 131 m (430 ft) deep, is predominantly characterised by gently sloping shores. Litzlberg Bay is separated from the rest of the lake by a large embankment. On this embankment lies a small island on which stands Litzlberg Castle.

=== Transit ===
The area can be reached via the West Autobahn (A1) with the Seewalchen and Sankt Georgen junctions. Two trunk roads run alongside the lake: the Attersee Road (B151) on the western shore and the Seeleiten Road (B152) on the eastern shore.

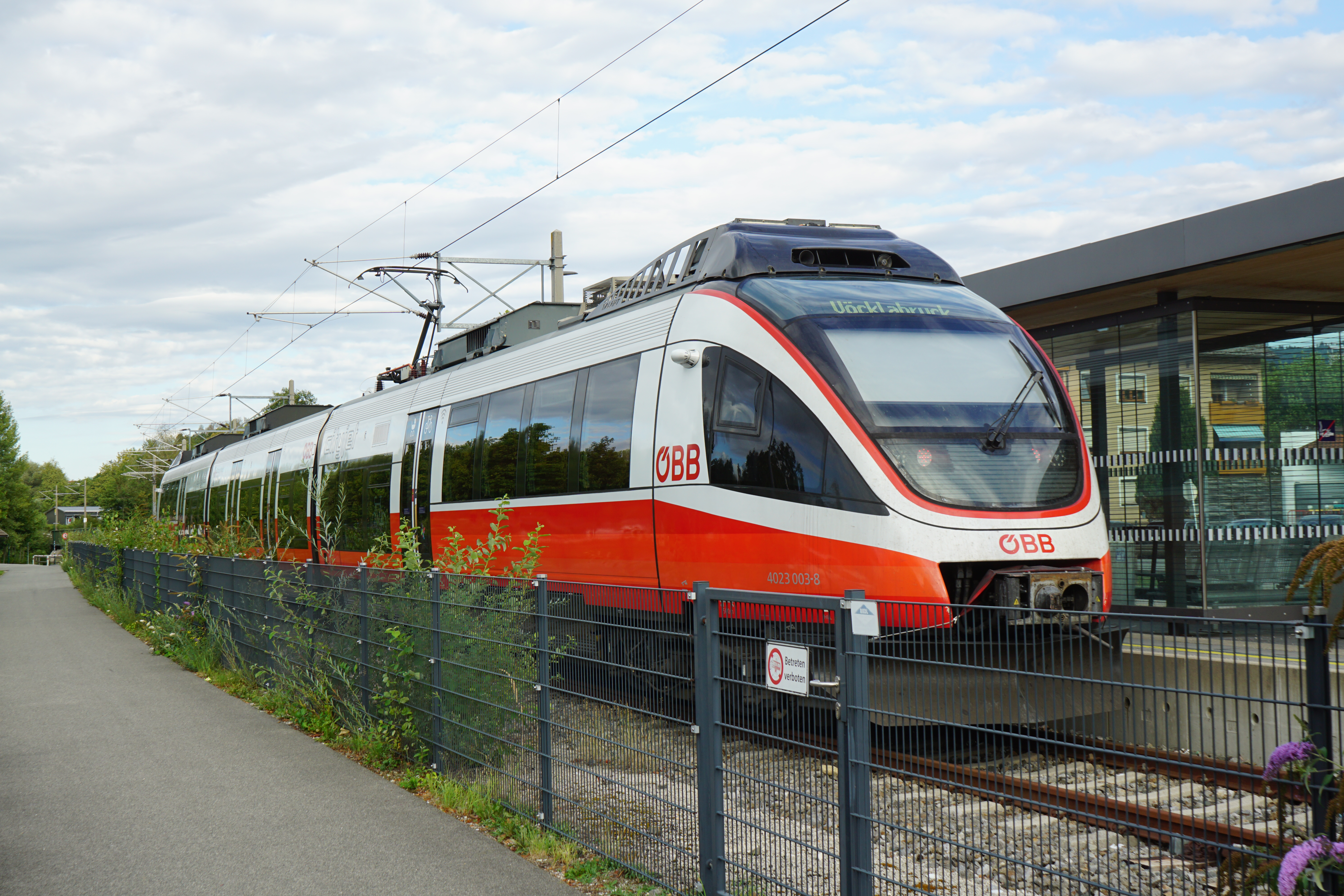
ÖBB class 4024 electric multiple unit at Kammer station

The lake is nowadays accessible via two branch lines. The Kammerer, a standard-gauge railway, completed in 1882, branches off from the Western Railway at Oberthalheim and runs to Kammer am Attersee at the northern end of the lake, to the right of the river Ager. The line is electrified at 15 kV, 16.7 Hz, it is owned by Austrian Federal Railways (ÖBB Infra) and operated by (ÖBB Passenger Services). Some of the Cityjet trains used on this route also run through to Attnang-Puchheim via Vöcklabruck from Kammer.

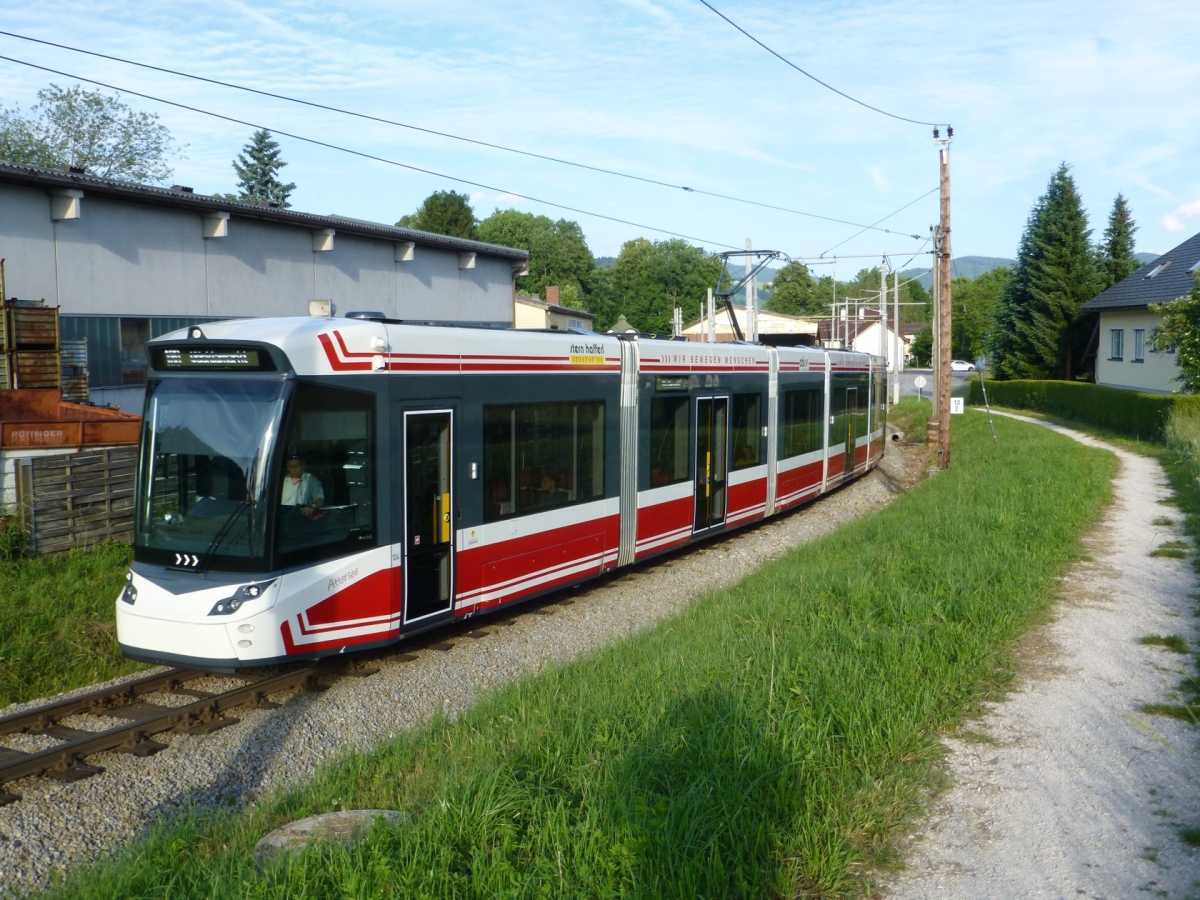
Stern & Hafferl Stadler Tramlink unit at Attersee am Attersee station

The Atterseebahn, a metre-gauge railway, opened in 1913, connects the town of Attersee on the western shore with Vöcklamarkt, which is also on the Western Railway. The line is majority-owned by Stern Gruppe and is electrified using 750 V direct current. At Vöcklamarkt station, passengers can change to trains on the Western Railway directly from the same platform.

The Unterach–See local railway linked the ferry terminals at Unterach on Attersee and See on Mondsee lake from 1907 to 1949. It was operated by Stern & Hafferl as a metre-gauge tramway electrified with 550 V DC.

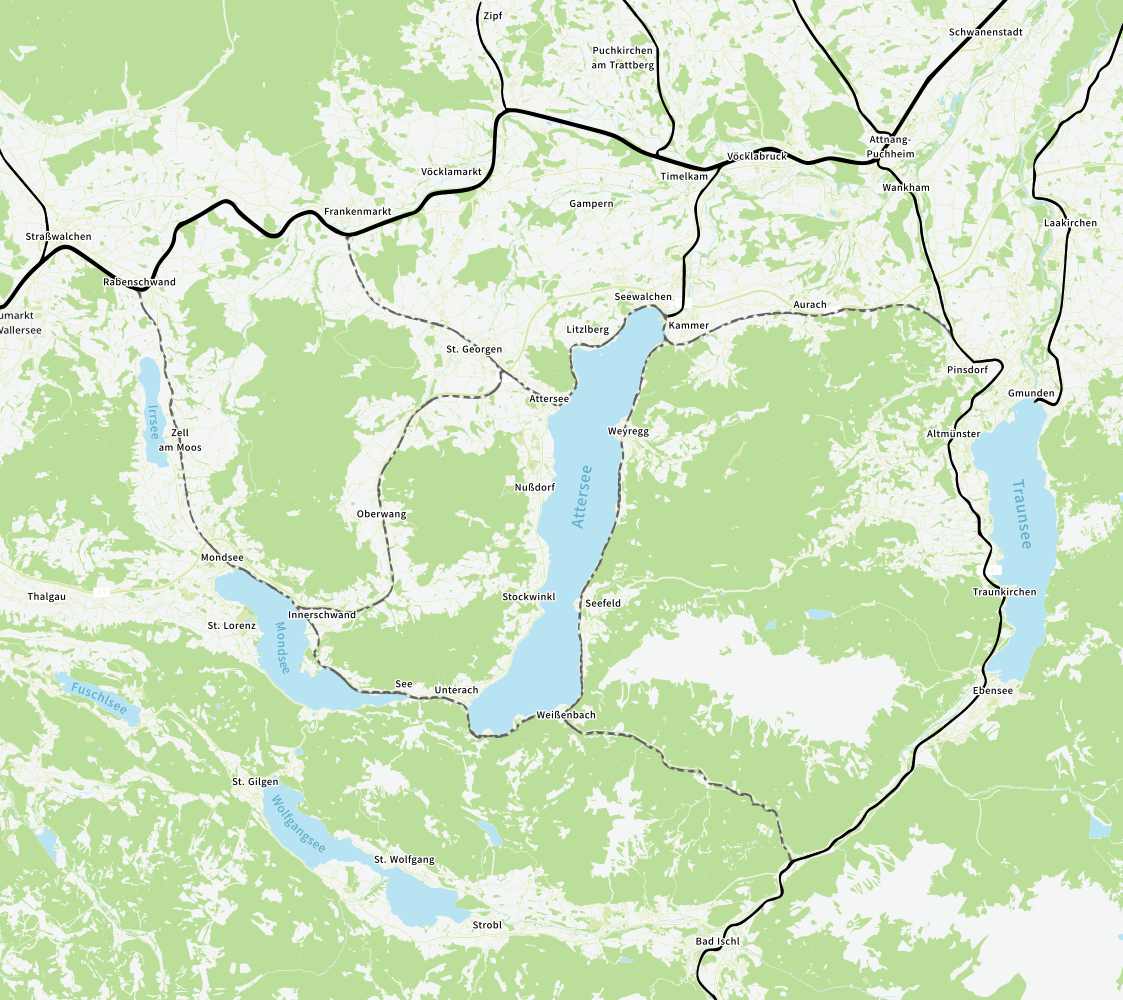
Railway lines planned to connect the Attersee by 1914 (grey dotted lines)

Up until 1914, several railway lines were planned along the Attersee. However, these were never built due to the First World War and the resulting shortage of materials. The planned routes had already been commissioned and surveyed. The plans included a standard-gauge line that was to branch off from the Western Railway at Frankenmarkt and run via Sankt Georgen, Attersee, Seewalchen, Kammer, Weyregg and Weißenbach to Bad Ischl, where it would connect with the Salzkammergut railway line. This line would have utilised part of the Atterseebahn track bed, which would have been converted to standard-gauge for this purpose between Sankt Georgen and Attersee am Attersee. Also planned was a standard-gauge line which, coming from Straßwalchen, was to branch off from the Western Railway at Rabenschwand and run via Zell am Moos, Mondsee, Innerschwand and Unterach to connect with the aforementioned line at Weißenbach. To relieve pressure on the Western Railway, a railway line was also planned from Weyregg via Kammer to Gmunden, which was to connect north of Gmunden to the Salzkammergut Railway. The route roughly corresponded to the course of the later Western Highway between Schörfling and Regau. A parliamentary resolution for this line had already been passed in 1913.

== Hydrology ==
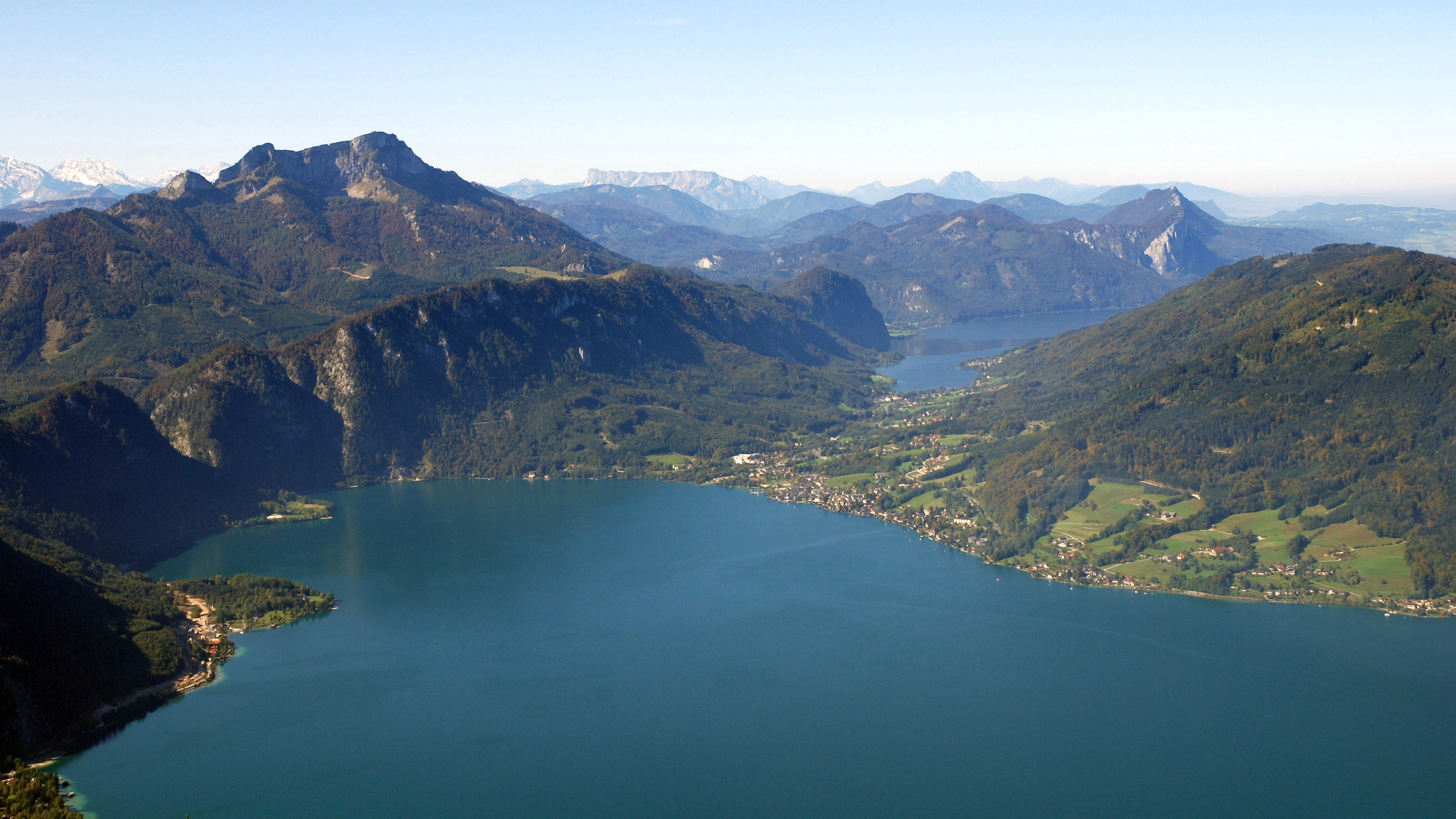
Mondsee lake (in the background) drains into Attersee via the Seeache

The hydrological catchment area of Attersee covers a total area of 464 km^{2} (179 sq mi). Attersee forms the final link in a chain of lakes that begins with Fuschlsee lake in the south-west and Irrsee lake (Zeller See) in the north-west. The water from both lakes flows into Mondsee lake and from there, via the 2.9 km-long (1.8 mi) Seeache in the south-west near Unterach, into Attersee. The Seeache accounts for 58 per cent of the total inflow. In addition, there are a number of other tributaries, such as the Weyregger Bach, the Alexenauer Bach, the Kienbach, the Äußerer Weißenbach, the Loidlbach, the Burggrabenbach, the Parschalenbach, the Dexelbach, the Nösstalbach and the Ackerlingbach, as well as numerous smaller surface and underground tributaries. The lake drains into the Ager at its northern end, between the municipality of Seewalchen and Schörfling. The water renewal period is 7 years, which is the highest theoretical water exchange rate of any lake in Upper Austria. The average water temperature is 13.7 °C (56.7 °F). The minimum water temperature, as measured near the surface between 2007 and 2010, was 3.5 °C (38.3 °F), whilst the maximum was 21.1 °C (70.0 °F).

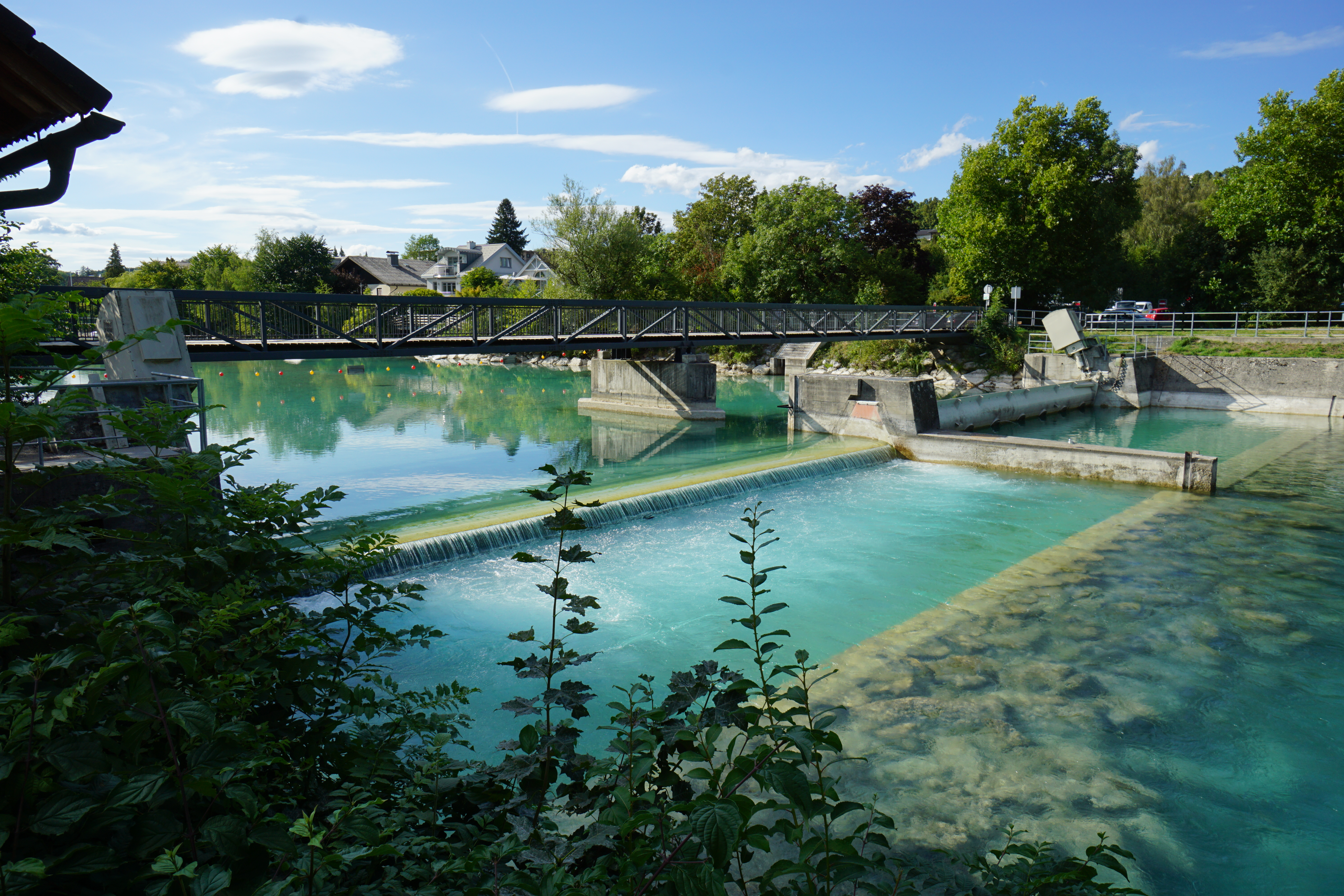
Weir at the outflow of the Attersee

The water level is regulated by a weir at the lake’s outlet. As a result of this artificial intervention, the average water level is around 20 centimetres (7.9 inches) higher and the natural annual fluctuation in water level is dampened. Nevertheless, there are regularly severe spring floods. Whilst maximum average water levels used to be reached from around April to May, they now occur about a month earlier (March to April). The lowest water levels are reached, now as in the past, primarily in autumn (October to November). According to records, between 1897 and 1913, the Attersee, with an average water level of 469.02 m.a.A. (1,538.8 ft), exhibited maximum water level fluctuations of 137 cm (54 in) and average annual fluctuations of 69 cm (27 in). The range of the monthly averages was 27 cm (11 in). For the period from 1976 to 2000, the corresponding figures were 469.02 m.a.A. (1,538.8 ft), 109 cm (43 in), 51 cm (20 in) and 13 cm (5.1 in).

== Geology ==
=== Tectonics ===
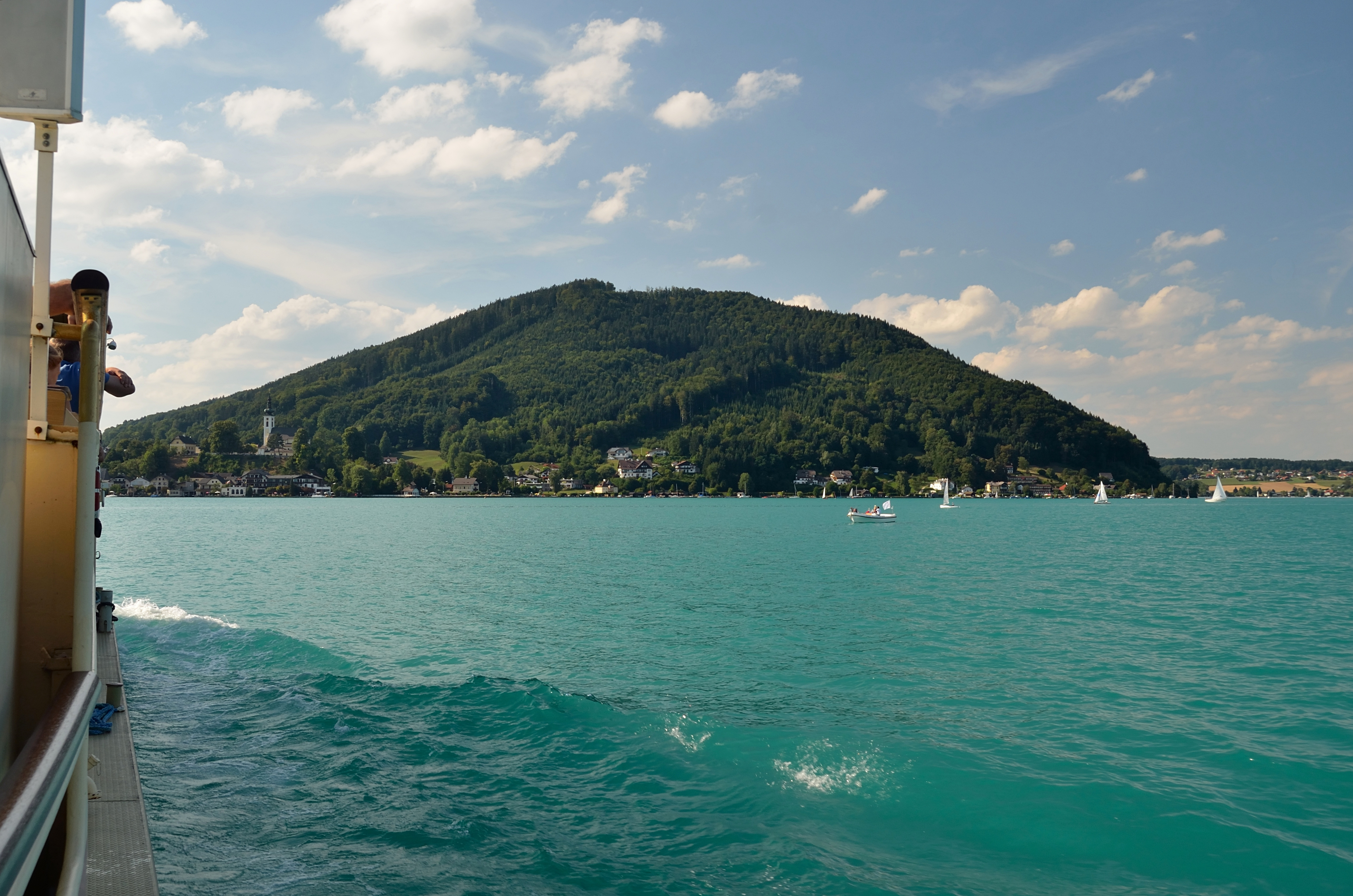
Buchberg at the Attersee is a classic flysch zone hill

Attersee lies within the area of three major tectonic units. To the south lie the Northern Limestone Alps, followed by the Flysch zone comprising the Rhenodanubian flysch, which is intermittently interrupted by the Ultrahelvetian. The Northern Limestone Alps consist of the Staufen–Höllengebirge nappe (Tirolikum), in front of which lies a narrow strip of the Langbath Zone (Bajuvarikum). This area forms the southern shore and extends along the eastern shore roughly as far as the village of Forstamt. The majority of the Attersee region is occupied by the Rhenodanubian flysch. In a narrow strip between Nußdorf am Attersee in the west and Alexenau in the east, the Ultrahelvetian formation is exposed.

=== Past glaciation and formation ===
Like all the lakes in the Salzkammergut, the Attersee is also the result of the activity of glaciers during the Ice Age. During the Ice Ages, the Traun Glacier flowed from the Hoher Dachstein and Totes Gebirge plateaus via lateral branches through the Isch Valley and the Weißenbach Valley into the Attersee region. In doing so, the glacier carved out the deep-cut tongue basin of the Attersee. The ice advance during the Mindel glaciation was the most powerful, and the ice flow from the Attersee trough flooded all the neighbouring valleys in the flysch zone, forming a widely extending foreland glacier from which the Buchberg near Attersee just about protruded as a nunatak. The subsequent ice ages gave the lake basin its present extent and shape. During the Late Glacial period, residual ice in the south and the moraine wall in the north blocked the outflow, resulting in the formation of a lake with a water level of approximately 550 metres above mean sea level (1,800 ft). The slow incision of the Ager river into the terminal moraine lowered the lake level to its present height. Following the final retreat of the ice and the formation of Attersee, extensive deltaic deposits accumulated at all the major tributaries. The delta sediments of the Äüßerer Weißenbach fill the entire Weißenbach valley to a thickness of around 100 m (330 ft). However, extensive delta formations have also developed at the mouths of the streams on the eastern side of Attersee due to the high volume of debris. Compared with the other large lakes in the Salzkammergut, silting of the Attersee basin is occurring more slowly, as the Mondsee, the Fuschlsee and the Irrsee lake (Zeller See) act as sediment catchers and silt traps upstream of it. The lake basin will have disappeared again in around 500,000 years.

=== Mass movements ===
During the post-glacial period, large-scale mass movements occurred on the southern and eastern flanks of the Hochplettspitz–Hollerberg mountain range. On the eastern flank, these feature prominently in the landscape due to their striking stair-step formation, extending from the ridge down to the lake bed. Landslides continue to occur to this day and, in some cases, have a significant impact on the shoreline areas. Sudden snowmelt and prolonged periods of rainfall destabilise slopes and sections of the valley. In September 1959, excessive rainfall triggered a landslide between Kammer and Weyregg. Even today, trees up to 20 m (66 ft) long can be found at depths of around 15 to 30 m (49 to 98 ft). These trees form the "underwater forest" well known to divers.

== Climate ==
The Attersee enjoys a rainy, mild winter lakeside climate. Due to its location on the northern edge of the Alps, rainfall is frequent. The lakeside climate is a special case because of the different heat transfer properties of the water and the local land–lake wind systems.

=== Temperature ===
The annual average temperature in the lake area ranges between 7 and 9 °C (45 and 48 °F). By comparison, temperatures on the flysch hills range only between 5 and 7 °C (41 and 45 °F). During the colder months, the lake acts as a heat reservoir. The western and northern shores of Attersee enjoy particularly mild conditions. The average January air temperature in the immediate lakeside area is among the warmest in Upper Austria, ranging between −1 and −3 °C (30 and 27 °F). The number of days with frost in the Attersee region is between 100 and 120. Summer temperatures do not differ as markedly from those of the surrounding area as the winter figures do. The average July air temperature ranges between 16 and 18 °C (61 and 64 °F). Spring brings relatively cold temperatures, as the lakes warm up only slowly after winter. Late frosts are possible until mid-May.

=== Precipitation ===
Due to the northern wind-sheltered location, annual precipitation totals of 1,000 to 1,600 millimetres (39 to 63 inches) are relatively high compared with the rest of Upper Austria. Precipitation increases with proximity to the mountains. The northern part of Attersee, for example, has an annual precipitation total of 1,000 to 1,200 mm (39 to 47 in). The southern end of Attersee records figures of around 1,400 to 1,600 mm (55 to 63 in). Precipitation peaks during the summer months from June to August. Thunderstorms occur very frequently at this time of year and may be accompanied by heavy rainfall.

=== Wind ===
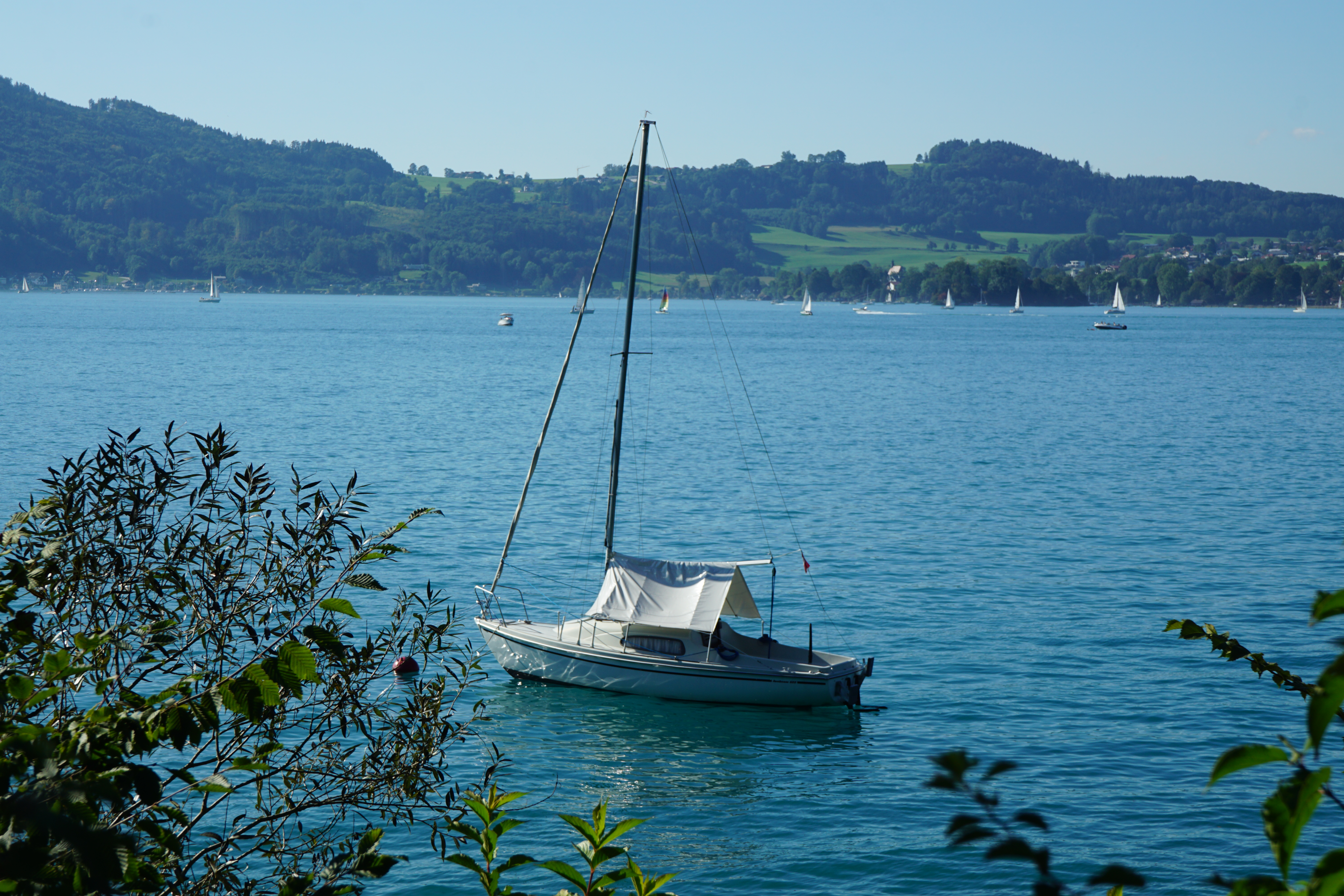
Typical size of sailing boats on Attersee

At the Weyregg weather station, north to north-easterly winds predominate during the day, blowing upriver as day winds. North-easterly winds are most common in summer, whilst north winds are most common in the winter months. At night, and particularly in summer, the south-easterly wind is very pronounced. Wind peaks of around 3 metres per second (9.8 feet per second) occur during the day, at night, the wind dies down. Over the course of the year, the strongest winds occur in January.

=== Fog ===
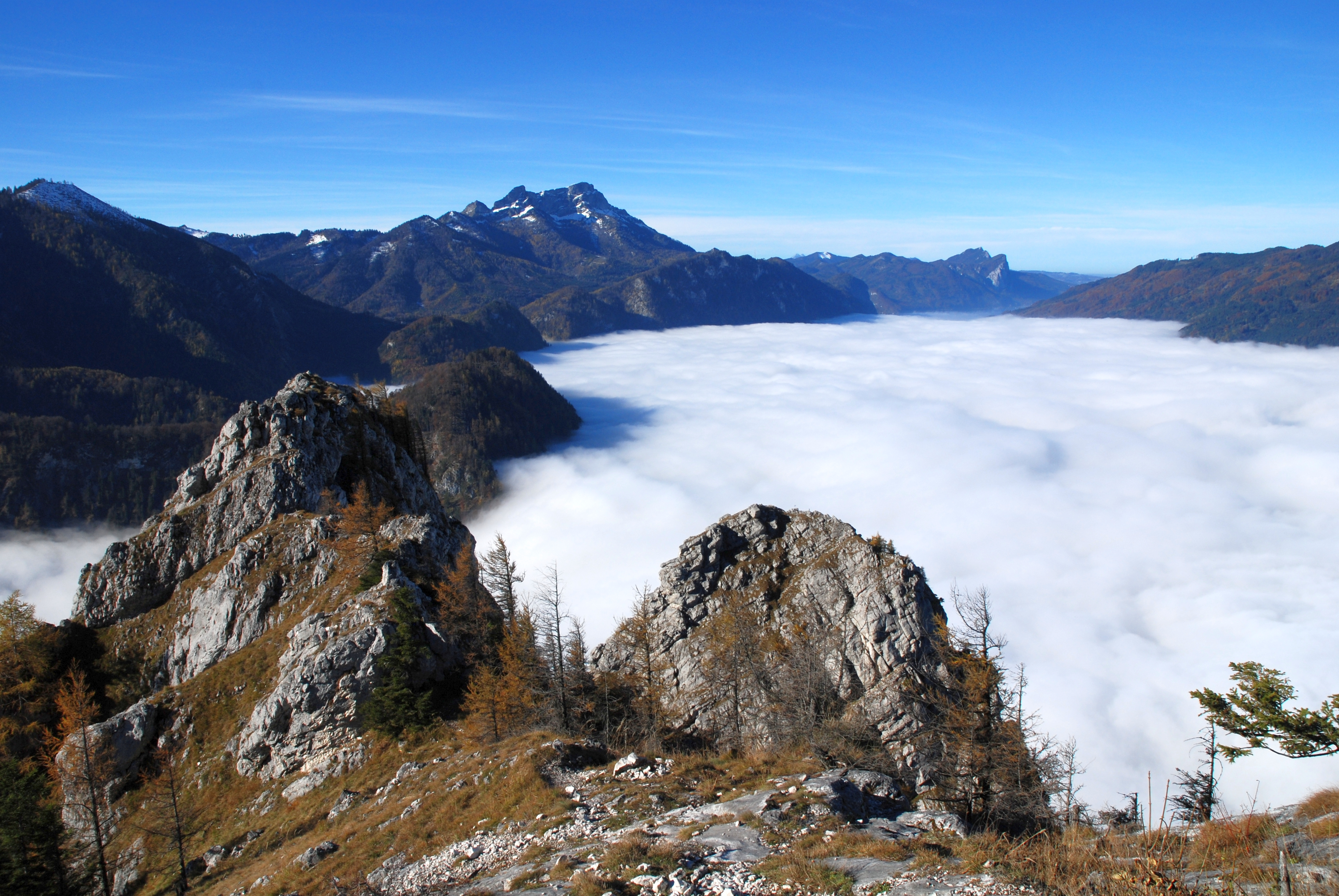
Inversion weather conditions on Attersee, view southwards from the Schoberstein

Due to the moist, warm air masses from Attersee and the nearby lakes Mondsee and Irrsee, fog frequently forms during the cold season. During inversion weather conditions, this fog can persist for weeks. The high-level fog layer in the Attersee-Mondsee basin usually extends up to around 700 m (2,300 ft) above sea level. In contrast to the valley, the higher-lying areas are then fog-free.

== Limnology ==
=== Circulation ===
Attersee is a dimictic lake and belongs to the category of Alpine lakes that are deeply stratified. Twice a year, in spring and fall, the wind can completely mix the water column due to the uniform temperature distribution. In summer and winter, the metalimnion separates the surface layer (epilimnion) from the deep, uniformly tempered part (hypolimnion) of the lake. The highest temperatures measured in open water in 2007 and 2008 were 20.2 and 21.0 °C (68.4 and 69.8 °F), respectively, both recorded in August. These values remained nearly unchanged down to a depth of 8 m (26 ft). Only below 12 m (39 ft) was a significant drop in temperature observed. Above the lake bed, the temperature remained very constant between 4.6 and 4.9 °C (40.3 and 40.8 °F). Full circulation in the fall extends into January, while spring circulation lasts until nearly the end of April. Winter stagnation typically lasts only two to three weeks. A continuous ice cover on Attersee is very rare due to its wind-exposed location and its enormous thermal capacity (e.g. 1928/29, 1939/40, and 1941/42), however, locally confined ice covers in wind-sheltered bays form during every harsh winter.

=== Trophy ===
The lake has a very low concentration of nutrients and is therefore oligotrophic. Even before the construction of the ring sewer system, which was built in the 1970s and 1980s, Attersee was considered nutrient-poor. Nevertheless, between 1974 and 1976, a trend toward eutrophication, characterized by increasing phytoplankton biomass and decreasing water clarity, was observed. This trend persisted until the early 1980s. In addition to slightly rising nutrient and algae concentrations in the lake water, some shallow bays and especially the estuary of the Seeache river exhibited signs of eutrophication. During this period, over 50 per cent of the phosphorus load entering the Attersee came via the Seeache river. As a result of remediation measures, nutrient inputs declined significantly beginning in 1982. Changes in the agricultural sector, such as the stagnation in the number of livestock and the ongoing conversion of arable land to grassland, also contributed to this reduction. In 1986, with an average phosphorus concentration of 4.9 μg/l, the lake reached the threshold for ultra-oligotrophy. Since 1989, average total phosphorus concentrations in Attersee have ranged between 2 and 3 μg/l. The differences in concentration between the epilimnion and hypolimnion are generally very small, with higher values occurring in the epilimnion of Attersee. Wastewater from the surrounding communities flows into this treatment plant in Lenzing an der Ager, operated by the Attersee Water Quality Association. The advantage of this is that the treatment plant is located outside the lake’s topographical watershed, so the wastewater, though treated, it is still rich in nutrients, does not pollute the lake.

=== Water clarity ===
With a water clarity of up to 20 m (66 ft), it is the clearest lake in Upper Austria. Maximum clarity is reached in winter. The lowest value was measured in August 2008 at 4.9 m (16 ft). The low water clarity and the milky-turquoise colour of the lake, often observed in summer, are a result of biogenic decalcification. However, a large portion of the calcium carbonate precipitated in the epilimnion avoids being re-dissolved during sedimentation through the hypolimnion and is deposited on the lake bed in the form of lake chalk. The total biogenic calcium carbonate production of Attersee is estimated at 11,000 to 12,000 metric tons (11,000 to 12,000 long tons; 12,000 to 13,000 short tons) per year.

== Flora ==
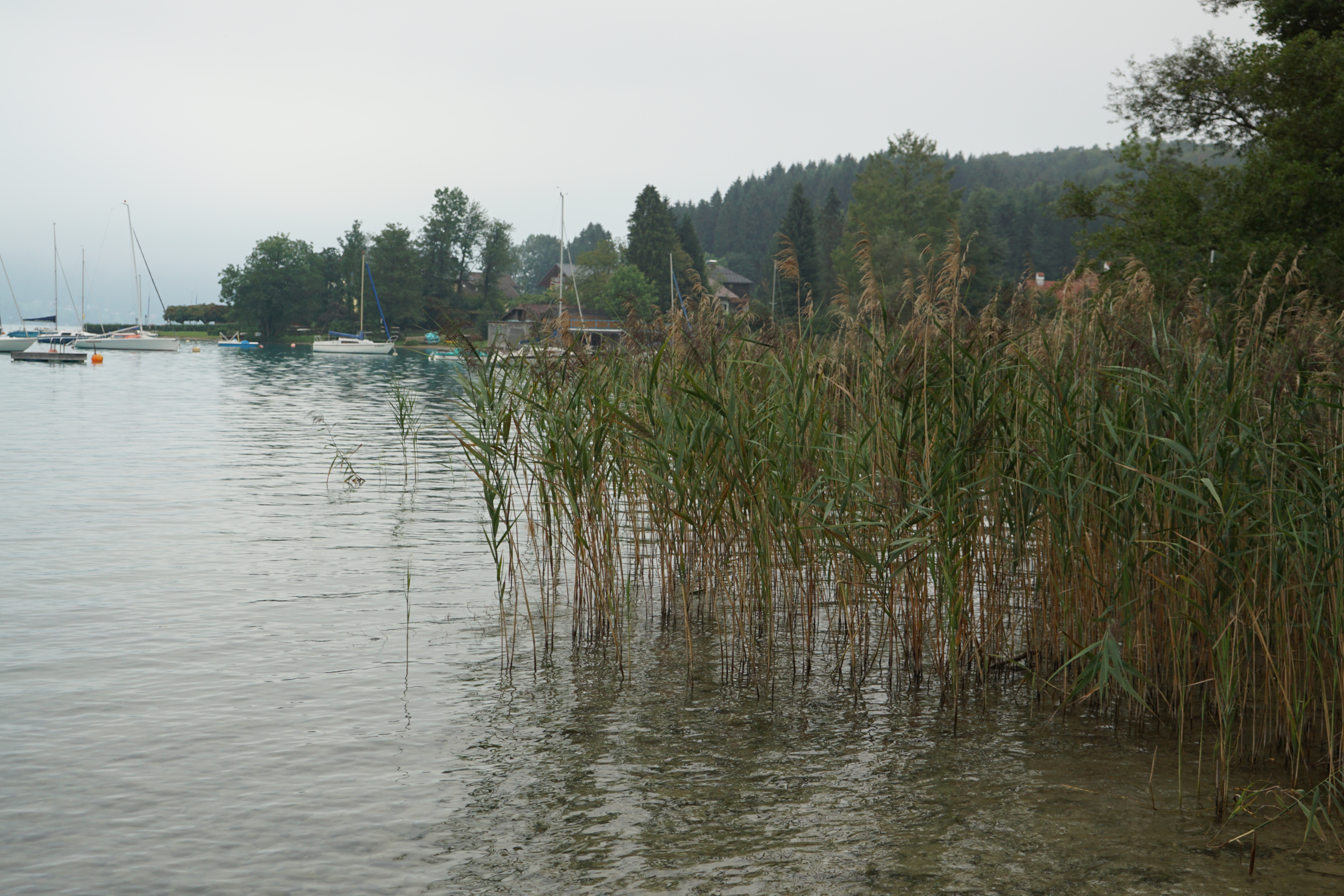
A small stock of reeds in Stockwinkl on the western shore of Attersee

With its varied shorelines and nutrient-poor, clear water, Attersee provides a habitat for many plants. As part of a macrophyte survey conducted in 2009, a total of 46 taxa (43 species plus three varieties) were identified. Thirty-seven of these are submerged plants, seven are part of the reed bed vegetation, and two are floating-leaved species. Particularly noteworthy is the diversity of charophyceae (14 taxa) and aquatic mosses (5 taxa). Charophytes, accounting for 83 per cent of the relative plant mass, are by far the dominant species group. The most common species in Attersee is the nitella opaca. Twenty-two species, roughly half of the species present, are listed on Austria’s Red Lists.

Reed vegetation is virtually nonexistent at Attersee and is dominated not by common reed (Phragmites australis), as is usually the case, but by common club-rush (Schoenoplectus lacustris). Nutrient-poor lakes such as Attersee naturally support only sparse, low-growing stands of reeds. Furthermore, due to the lake’s morphology, there is hardly any room for extensive reed beds. The eastern and southern shores of the lake, with their steeply sloping banks and rocky substrate, offer little habitat for reed beds. The western shore is primarily affected by extensive shoreline reinforcement. There is no continuous reed belt, only small, island-like patches exist. Between Buchberg and Litzlberg, there are also denser stands.

The floating-leaf vegetation of Attersee is only marginally developed. Of the two species present, the white water lily (Nymphaea alba) dominates over the yellow water lily (Nuphar lutea). Both of these Red List species are among the rarest plants in Attersee. Small populations at Attersee can be found, for example, in Mühlleitner Bay.

Submerged vegetation in Attersee is dominated by stoneworts and, thanks to the clear water, extends to a depth of 22 m (72 ft). The vegetation there follows a typical depth zonation. Shallow-water characeae, such as Chara aspera, grow in Attersee down to a depth of 2 to 4 m (6 ft 7 in to 13 ft 1 in) This is followed by the zone of mid-depth characeae (such as Chara contraria), which extends to a maximum depth of 10 m (33 ft), though predominantly to 7 m (23 ft). This zone gives way to deep-water characeae, with an average depth range of 10 to 11 m (33 to 36 ft). Extensive Nitella beds extend all the way to the vegetation limit, which averages 15.6 m (51 ft) but can also be significantly greater (up to 22 m [72 ft]).

== Fauna ==
=== Fish ===
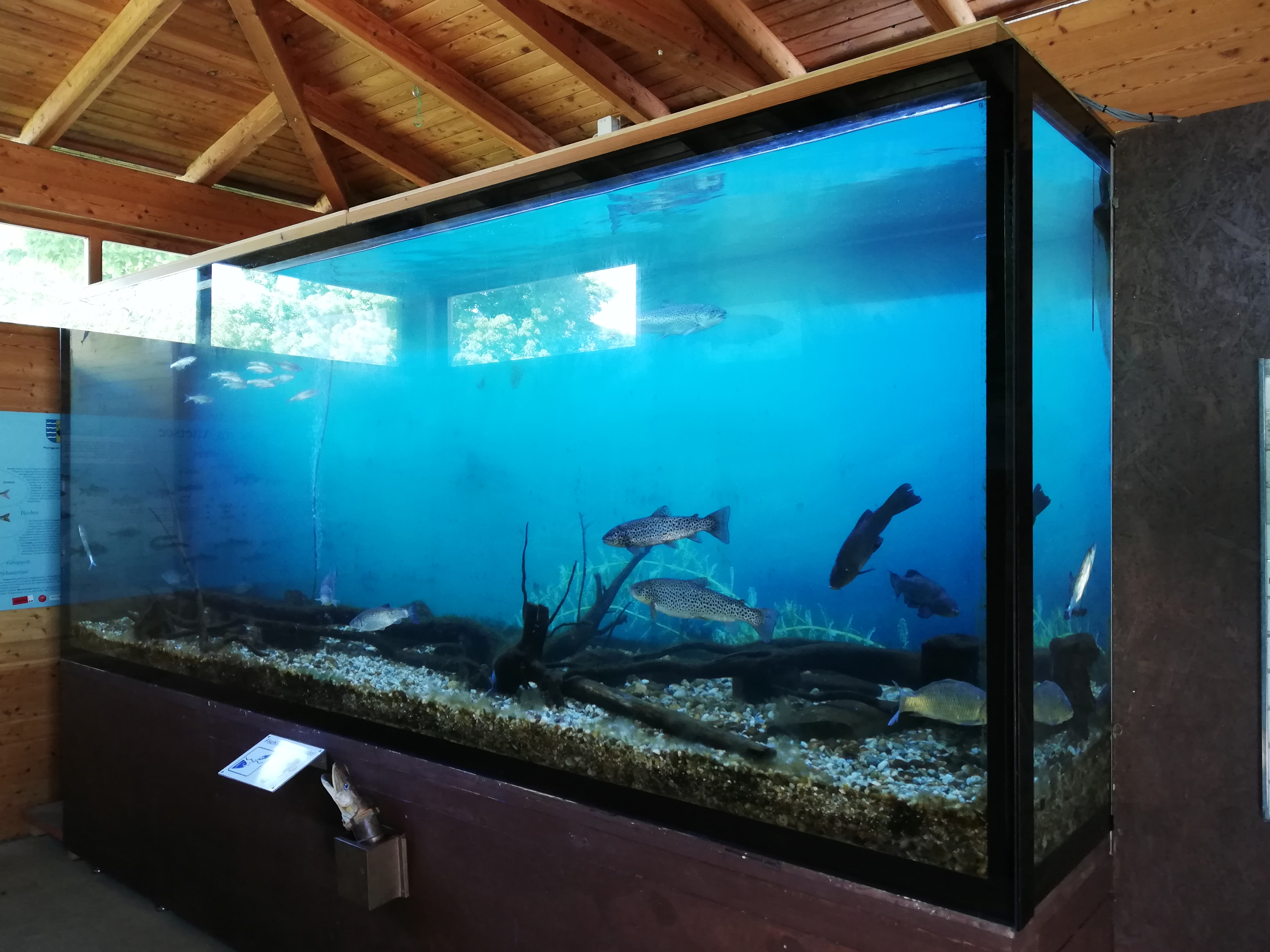
Local fish species can be viewed at the Weyregg Aquarium.

Attersee provides a habitat for a wide variety of species and is classified as an "Elritzensee" in terms of fish ecology. These are lakes characterised by a large surface area, considerable depth and an elevation of between approximately 460 and 1,100 m.a.A. (1,510 and 3,610 ft). The indicator species is the minnow. Other species found here include: european eel, burbot, european chub, common bream, european perch, ruffe, common dace, pike, european carp, european bullhead, pearlfish, roach, rudd, vimba, tench, loach, lake trout, danube bleak, lake char, catfish and zander. Species of the genus Coregonus are locally known as "Reinanken". Given the many different regional variations, it is difficult to establish a systematic classification of the individual populations of the genus Coregonus. However, for Attersee and Mondsee lake, the species "Attersee Reinanke" (Coregonus atterensis) has been described.

=== Birds ===
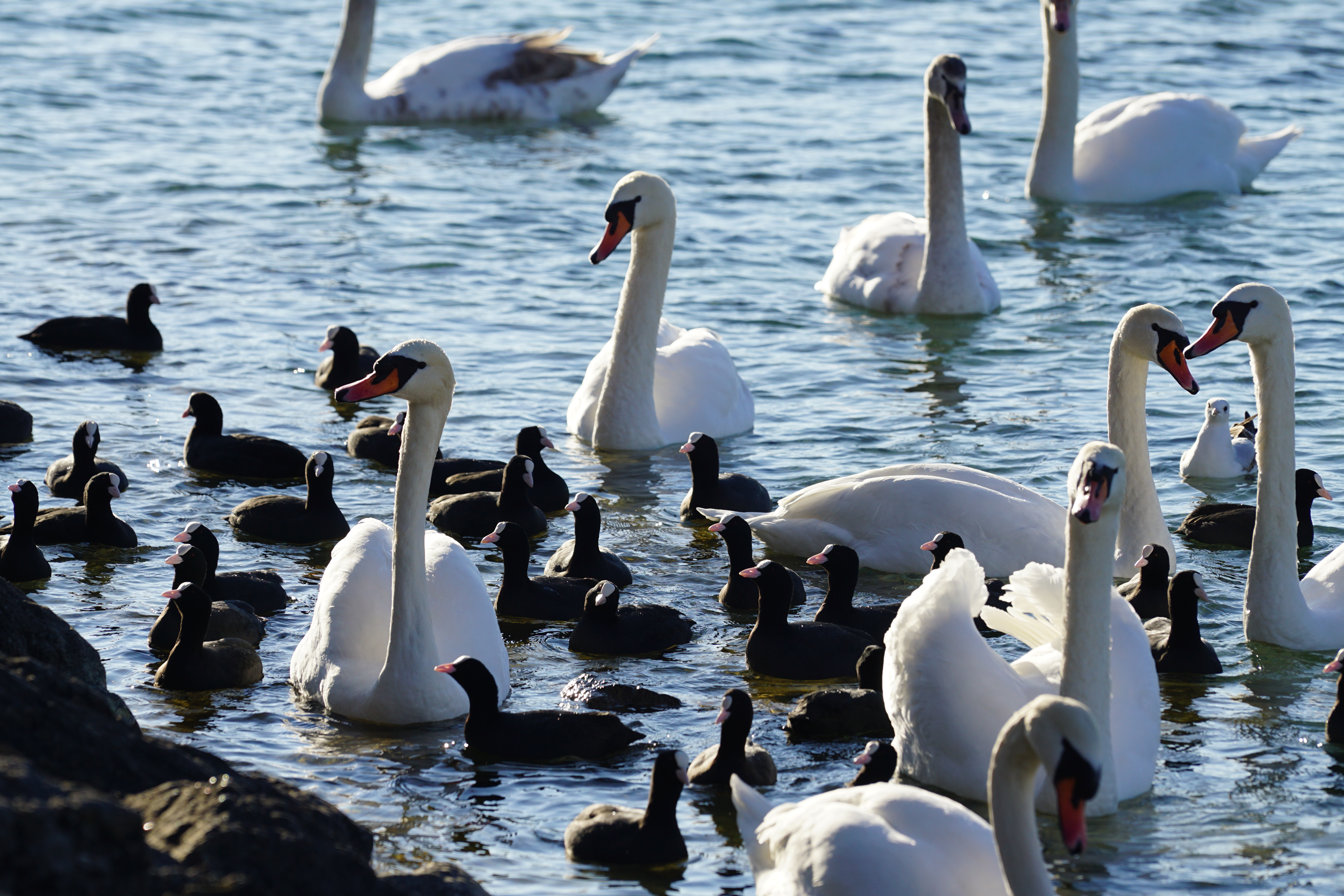
Mute swans and coots at Kammer on Attersee

The most striking bird species on Attersee and the other lakes of the Salzkammergut is the mute swan (Cygnus olor), which was introduced in Nußdorf, Weyregg and Steinbach in 1932. The lake is a habitat for many species of duck. One species frequently encountered is the mallard (Anas platyrhynchos). Less common are the tufted duck (Aythya fuligula), goldeneye (Bucephala clangula), eider (Somateria mollissima) and pochard (Aythya ferina). Alongside the common black-headed gull (Chroicocephalus ridibundus), the common gull (Larus canus) is also found. The great crested grebe (Podiceps cristatus) and the little grebe (Tochybaptus ruficollis) are also common. The populations of many species are subject to significant seasonal fluctuations. The population of the coot (Fulica atra) peaks between January and March. Only the mute swan breeds on Attersee, the other species leave the area during the breeding season or retreat to the streams. Despite regulations prohibiting it, tourists often feed mute swans and other waterbirds. This additional food supply artificially maintains the population at an unnaturally high level, leading to damage caused by droppings and grazing.

=== Crustaceans ===
The stone crayfish (Austropotamobius torrentium) and the european crayfish (Astacus astacus) were native to Attersee until the 1970s. The introduction of the signal crayfish (Pacifastacus leniusculus), a carrier of crayfish plague, led to the extinction of the native populations. The stone crayfish has only managed to survive in small tributaries feeding into Attersee, which are isolated from the lake by pipes. These barriers protect against the upstream migration of signal crayfish and break the chain of transmission.

== Nature conservation ==
Attersee forms part of the European protected area Mondsee and Attersee (AT3117000) under the Habitats Directive, as part of the Natura 2000 network. The protected area covers 6,134.4 ha (15,158 acres) and comprises Mondsee lake, Attersee, the Seeache river, and the lower reaches of the Zeller Ache, Fuschler Ache and Äußerer Weißenbach rivers. The features that led to the designation of this area as a European protected area (Natura 2000 site) are the habitat type of oligo- to mesotrophic calcareous waters with benthic vegetation consisting of charophyte algae, as well as the two fish species, the pearlfish (Rutilus meidingeri) and the minnow (Phoxinus phoxinus). To ensure the unimpeded passage of migrating fish, a fish ladder was constructed at the weir on the outflow in 2015.

== Economy ==
=== Tourism ===
Thanks to its good water quality, water temperatures suitable for swimming, particularly in sheltered areas along the shore, and good sailing conditions resulting from its open location with relatively constant and predictable wind patterns, Attersee is of great importance to tourism, and summer tourism is a key source of economic value for the region. One third of visitors come from within the state of Austria and two thirds from other European Union states. Winter tourism plays only a minor role. After the summer season, which runs from May to September, many businesses close for the winter. As tourism is heavily dependent on the weather and there a little activities suitable for bad or all-weather conditions, the number of overnight stays across the region has, in some cases, declined sharply in recent years. The number of day visitors coming from the central areas of Linz and Salzburg to go swimming is rising. On fine summer days, and particularly at weekends, the public swimming areas and car parks are often overcrowded.

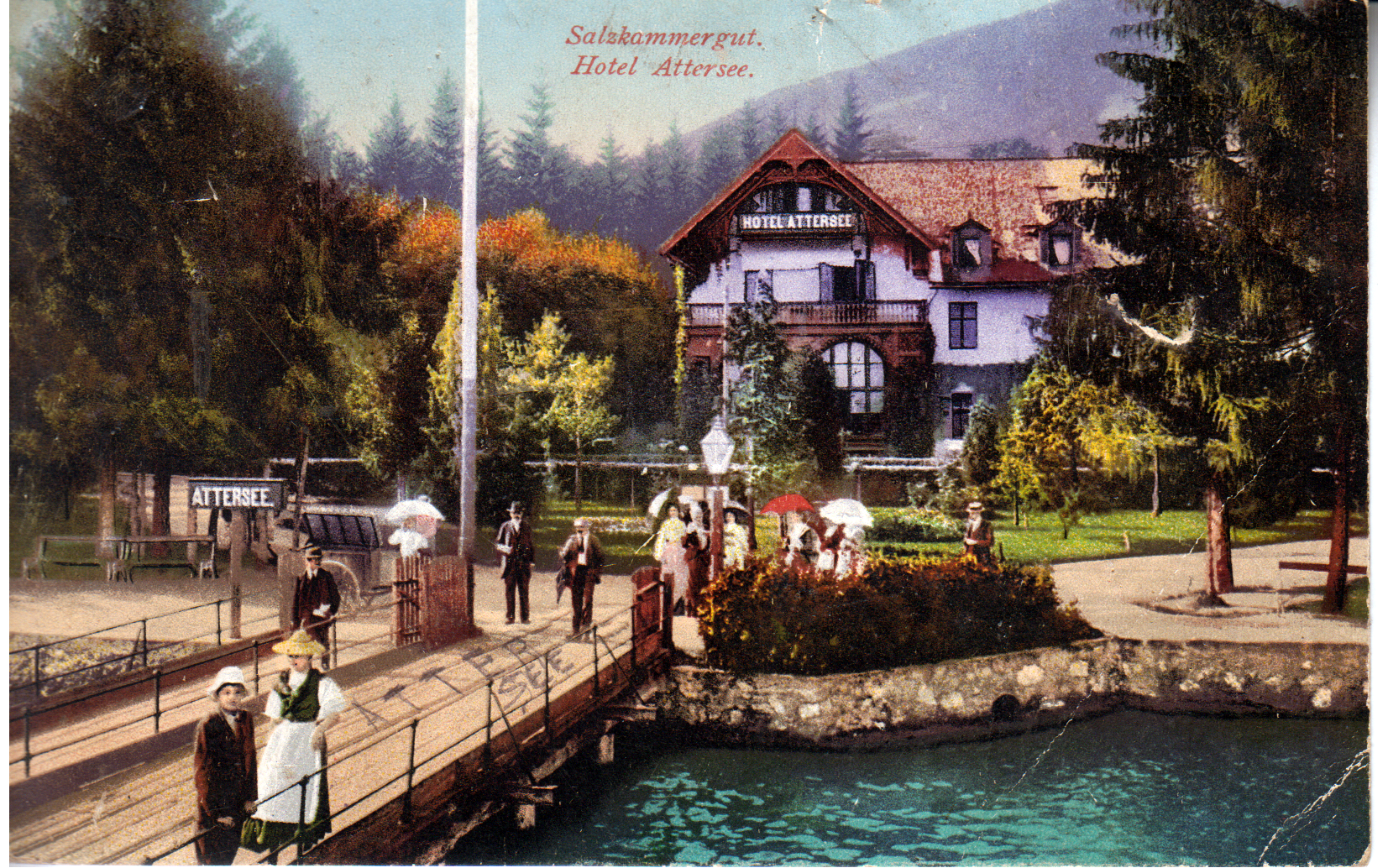
The "Hotel Attersee" on a postcard from 1906, during the heyday of Sommerfrische in imperial Austria

As early as 1892, an association was founded to promote summer holidays on Attersee. In 1926–27, it was re-established as the Tourist Board for the Attersee and Mondsee region. In 1952, the Attersee Association was established, in 1999, the local associations of the Attersee municipalities merged to form the multi-component tourism association (tourism region) "Holiday Region Attersee", which was also a founding member of Salzkammergut Tourismus GmbH in 2001 (since then known as the Holiday Region Attersee–Salzkammergut). In 2019, the Attersee and Attergau tourism associations, together with those of Frankenmarkt and Vöcklamarkt, merged to form a single large association and now operate under the name Attersee-Attergau Tourism Association.

A number of lakeside bathing areas, owned by the Austrian Federal Forests, the state of Upper Austria or the neighbouring municipalities, are open to the public. In the south and south-east, there are also a few narrow stretches of lakeshore open to the public, although these are situated directly alongside the main roads.

=== Shipping ===
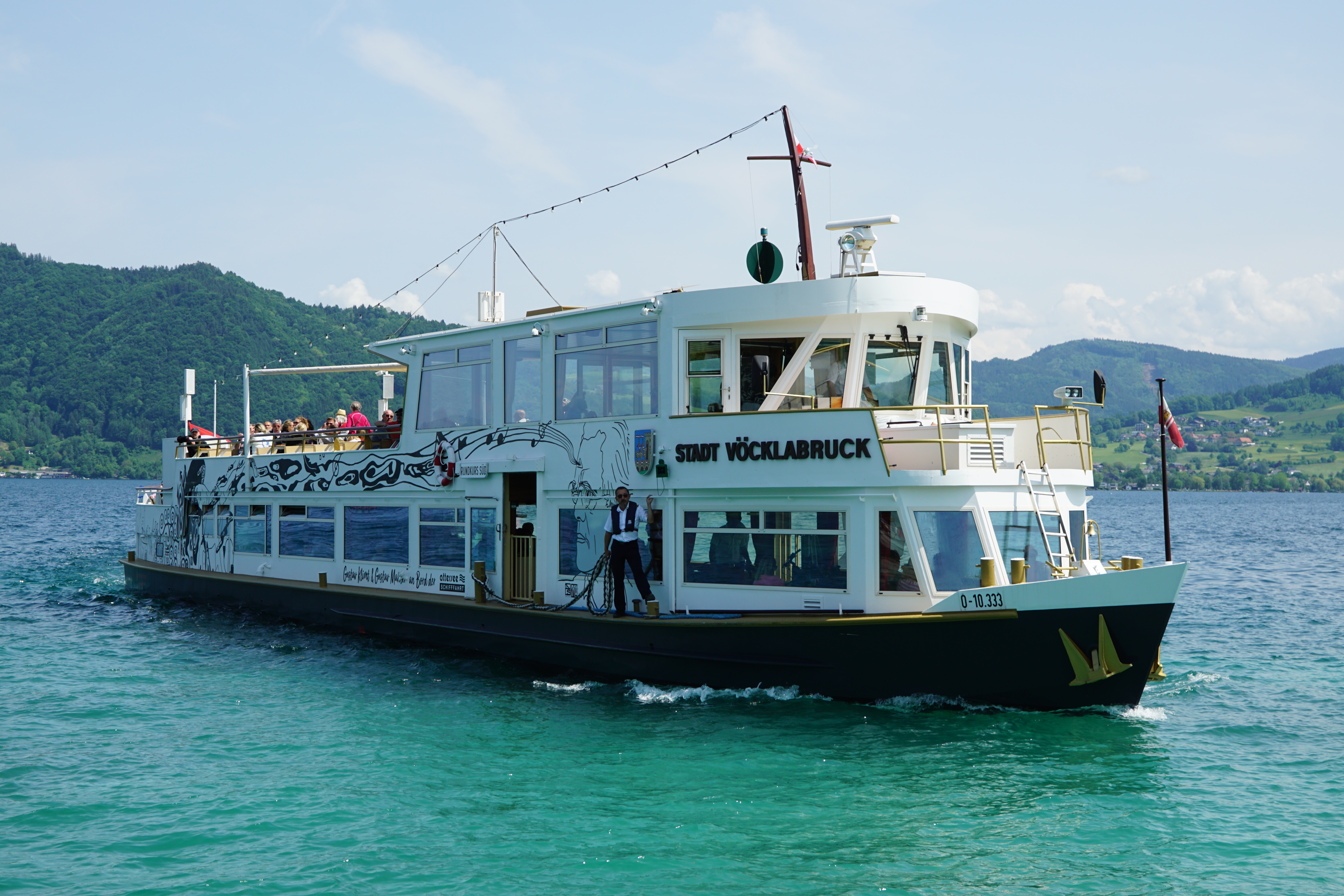
The MS Stadt Vöcklabruck before docking at Attersee

Commercial shipping on Attersee was established in 1869. Today, Stern Schifffahrt GmbH, a wholly-owned subsidiary of the Stern Gruppe, based in Gmunden, operates the lake’s shipping services. Three vessels run regularly on two circular routes. The Northern Circular Route runs between Seewalchen and Weyregg, whilst the Southern Circular Route runs between Weyregg and Unterach.

=== Fishing ===
Fishing on Attersee is now rarely practised as a full-time occupation. Most operations are run as a secondary income or by inns with their own fish farms. Fishing rights are the property of the landowner and may be sold or leased. It is the responsibility of the fisheries districts to issue licences, regulate species-appropriate annual stocking and set catch limits. Attersee is divided into 56 fishing rights (large-scale and small-scale fishing rights), which are grouped together under the Attersee Fisheries District. In 1997, fish stocking totalled 1.5 million whitefish, 0.5 million pike and 350,000 vendace. The estimated total annual catch is approximately 5–7 kilograms per hectare (4.5–6.2 pounds per acre).

== Sport ==
=== Boating ===
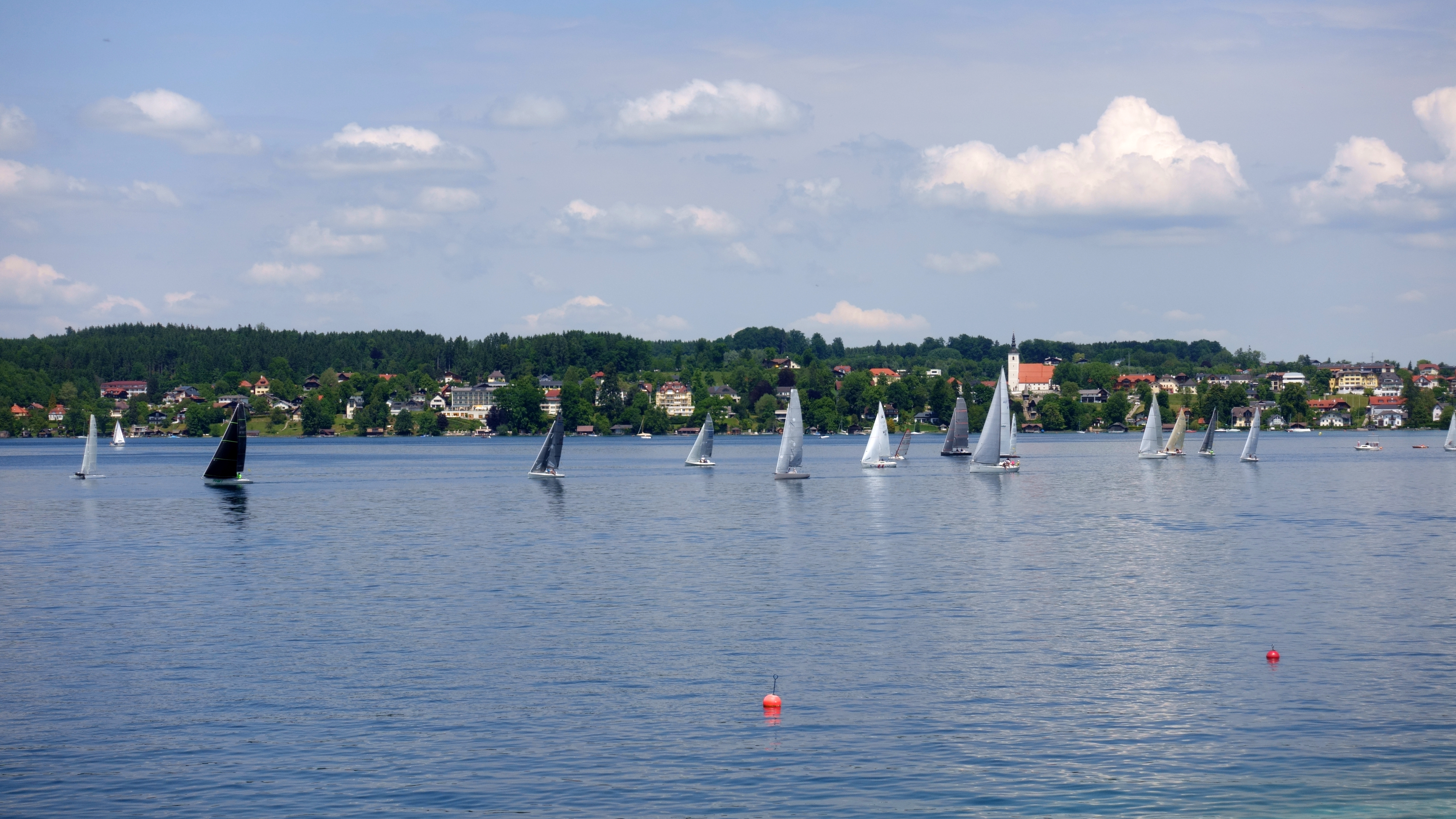
Attersee is a popular sailing destination

Thanks to its favourable wind conditions, Attersee is a popular destination for sailing and windsurfing. There are eight sailing clubs on the lake. The Union-Yacht-Club Attersee, based in Attersee am Attersee, was founded as early as 1886 and is the largest club on the lake. Attersee is known for the so-called ‘Rosenwind’, a typical thermal wind that develops due to the topographical conditions. In stable, fine weather, the warming of the mountain range to the south in the late morning creates a vertical airflow, which is fed by cool air flowing in from the northern outlet of the Ager river into the mountainous basin to the south. This creates a steady, fresh breeze even under stable high-pressure conditions. The second main wind direction is the westerly wind, which is known for its strong and unpredictable gusts. In July and August, the use of internal combustion engines on ships and boats is prohibited. Exceptions to this ban include commercial fishing, scheduled passenger shipping, and rescue and fire service vessels.

=== Scuba diving ===
Thanks to the generally excellent visibility and the steep underwater cliff faces on the eastern shore, Attersee is a popular diving spot. However, due to numerous accident, particularly in the area known as the Schwarze Brücke (trans. Black Bridge), Attersee has gained infamous notoriety amongst scuba divers. According to rescue service statistics, between 1971 and February 2009, 13 divers who had been involved in accidents and were recovered dead from the lake. On 18 September 2005, Hans Brandstätter reached a depth of 165 m (541 ft), setting a new Austrian record.

=== Cycling ===
Once a year, usually in early May, a car-free cycling event is held, during which a 48 km (30 mi) route around the lake via Attersee Road (B 151) and Seeleiten Road (B 152) is closed to motor traffic. This event is very popular, with more than 50,000 cyclists and skaters taking part in 2018

Since 2011, the King of the Lake race has been held annually in September on the same route. Anyone can take part in the team and individual time trials around Attersee, which most recently covered a distance of 47.2 km (29.3 mi). In 2018, the race attracted around 1,200 riders from across Europe. The start and finish are located at the marina in the village of Kammer, which is part of Schörfling am Attersee.

=== Safety ===
There are five branches of the Austrian Water Rescue Federation (ÖWR) around Attersee. These are the Litzlberg and Seewalchen branches in the municipality of Seewalchen am Attersee, as well as Nußdorf, Unterach and Weyregg in their respective municipalities. The Nußdorf branch is the largest in Upper Austria, with over 450 members. The ÖWR’s activities on Attersee are not limited to rescuing people and recovering boats, but also include preventative measures such as swimming lessons and youth work.

== Etymology ==
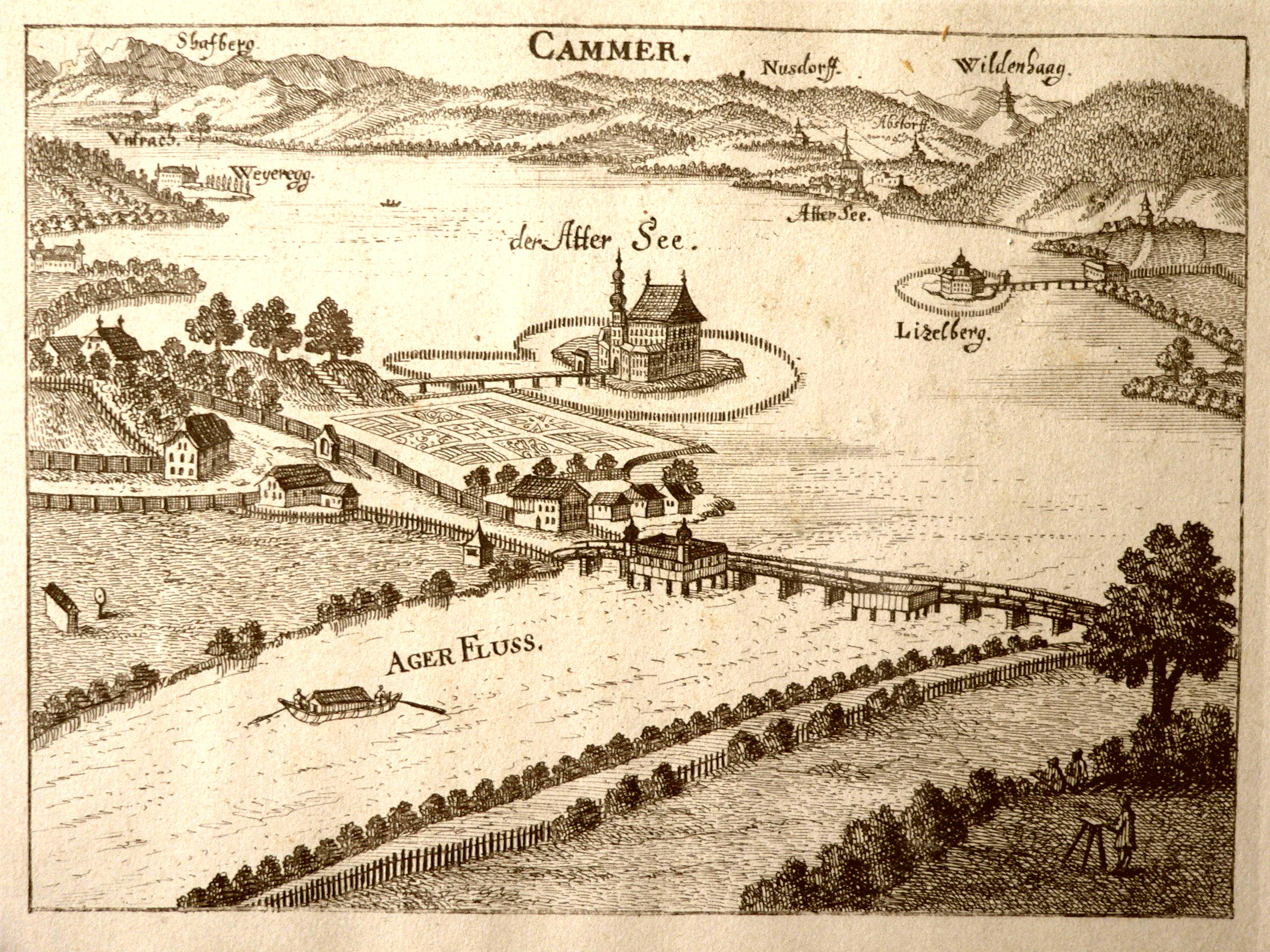
Engraving of Attersee, Schloss Kammer and Litzlberg from 1674

The name Attersee is first mentioned in the year 798 as "super lacum Aterse", whilst the surrounding region, the Attergau, is mentioned as early as 748 as "intra atergauui". The Old High German word "Atara" is the primary determiner in the compound terms Attersee and Attergau. Atara is usually traced back to the Indo-European adra (watercourse) as a pre-Germanic name for a body of water, although Atara is not attested as a name for a body of water and the Attersee is a large lake rather than a flowing watercourse. Another possible interpretation of the name is that the outlet of the Attersee, the Ager (Agria), rhymes with Adra, and that the Attersee and Mondsee together form a single system. "Mondsee" is a comparatively recent name, and it is conceivable that this was the original designation for the parts of the Mondsee–Attersee system: the upper, rear section (Mondsee and Seeache) bore the name Adra, whilst the lower, front section – particularly its outlet – bore the name Agra (Agria). With the renaming of the upper part as Mondsee, the scope of the name Adra has been displaced downstream to the Attersee. "Kammersee" refers to Schloss Kammer (Kammer Castle) in Schörfling am Attersee and thus to the "Kammergut" as a feudal estate and to the Salzkammergut itself.

The place names Seewalchen and Ainwalchen refer to the presence of the Romans, who were known as "Walchen" by the Germanic peoples. Most place names around Attersee date from the early Middle Ages. In particular, place names ending in -ing indicate very early baiuvariin settlement.

== History ==
=== Settlement history ===
The earliest evidence of settlement is provided by pile-dwelling remains from the Neolithic on the shores of Attersee. The oldest find from Seewalchen dates to around 3,900 years BC and is attributed to the Mondsee group. The pile-dwelling settlements were located primarily in the shallower areas along the western shore, from Unterach to the northern end at Schörfling, and along the eastern shore at Weyregg. The remains, which are now submerged, were originally located on the shore, as the lake level was lower at that time. A rise in the lake level during the late Copper Age then brought an end to settlement activity along the shore. Climatic changes involving increased precipitation, such as those that occurred during the Early Atlantic period, may have been a contributing factor. In 2011, the sites Abtsdorf I and III and Litzlberg South were included in the transboundary UNESCO World Heritage Site "Prehistoric Pile Dwellings around the Alps". Further artifact finds along the shore attest to continuous settlement up to the beginning of the Bronze Age. Seewalchen has yielded finds of supraregional significance from the Copper Age and the later Bronze Age, such as a razor or a bronze dagger. Both objects are on display at the Natural History Museum Vienna.

In 1974, during an archaeological excavation on the Buchberg on the northwest shore, a ring wall measuring approximately 550 by 200 m (1,800 by 660 ft), which encircles the flatter summit of the Buchberg, was examined for the first time. Several artifacts dating from the Neolithic to the Bronze Age were recovered during this excavation. During the University of Vienna’s archaeological research and teaching excavation, it was determined that the fortification on the Buchberg was a Late Bronze Age (circa 1300–800 B.C.) hilltop settlement.

Celtic-Roman settlement activity is evidenced by a hoard find at the Kaiserbrunnen in Unterach. On the eastern shore, a Roman road ran through the Weißenbach Valley to Bad Ischl. In Weyregg, there are remains of a villa rustica with well-preserved mosaics. In front of the villa are stone embankments in the lake, though it is unclear whether these are the remains of a harbour facility or a fish pond (piscina).

Following the decline of the Western Roman Empire, the Baiuvarii took over the region. In the Early Middle Ages, the secular center was located in what is now the town of Attersee. On the Attersee Kirchberg, there was a royal court, which was first mentioned in a document in 885 as "Atarnhova" (Atterhofen) and was visited several times by Frankish kings during the 9th century. A visit by Arnulf of Carinthia is documented for 888.

=== Rafting ===
For centuries, timber rafting was an important economic activity on Attersee. With the establishment of the salt works in Ebensee on Traunsee lake in 1604, the timber industry in the southern Attergau region shifted its focus to the production of firewood for the boiling house. Around 400 stere of wood were required each week for salt production in the boiling pans. The forestry office was established within the municipality of Steinbach to manage the monarchy’s imperial forests. Many valleys were developed for timber transport. A sophisticated system of splash dams was established. Transporting timber from the Kienbach Valley, situated on the northern side of the Höllengebirge, proved complicated. The timber was first floated down the Kienbach to Attersee and then transported by flat-bottomed boats (Plätten) to Weißenbach. Further transport usually took place in winter using ox-drawn sledge carts. From the watershed (Umkehrstube), the timber could be floated again as far as the salt works in Ebensee. To make the work easier, a hydraulic lift capable of overcoming a height difference of 50 m (160 ft), with an adjoining flume, was built in 1722.

Timber, particularly long shipbuilding timber, was also transported from the southern part of the lake to the outlet on the Ager in the form of large timber rafts fitted with several sails. There, the rafts were dismantled into smaller sections and floated down the Ager and Traun rivers to the Danube. In 1877, the opening of the Salzkammergut Railway enabled the transport of cheap lignite from the Hausruck deposits, which led to the abandonment of timber transport to Ebensee. With the expansion of the road network, increasing motorisation and the construction of power stations on the rivers, rafting came to an end in the mid-20th century. On the lakeside promenade in Kammer, just above the Ager Bridge, the rafting monument commemorates the former transhipment point used by raftsmen and boatmen.

== The lake in art ==
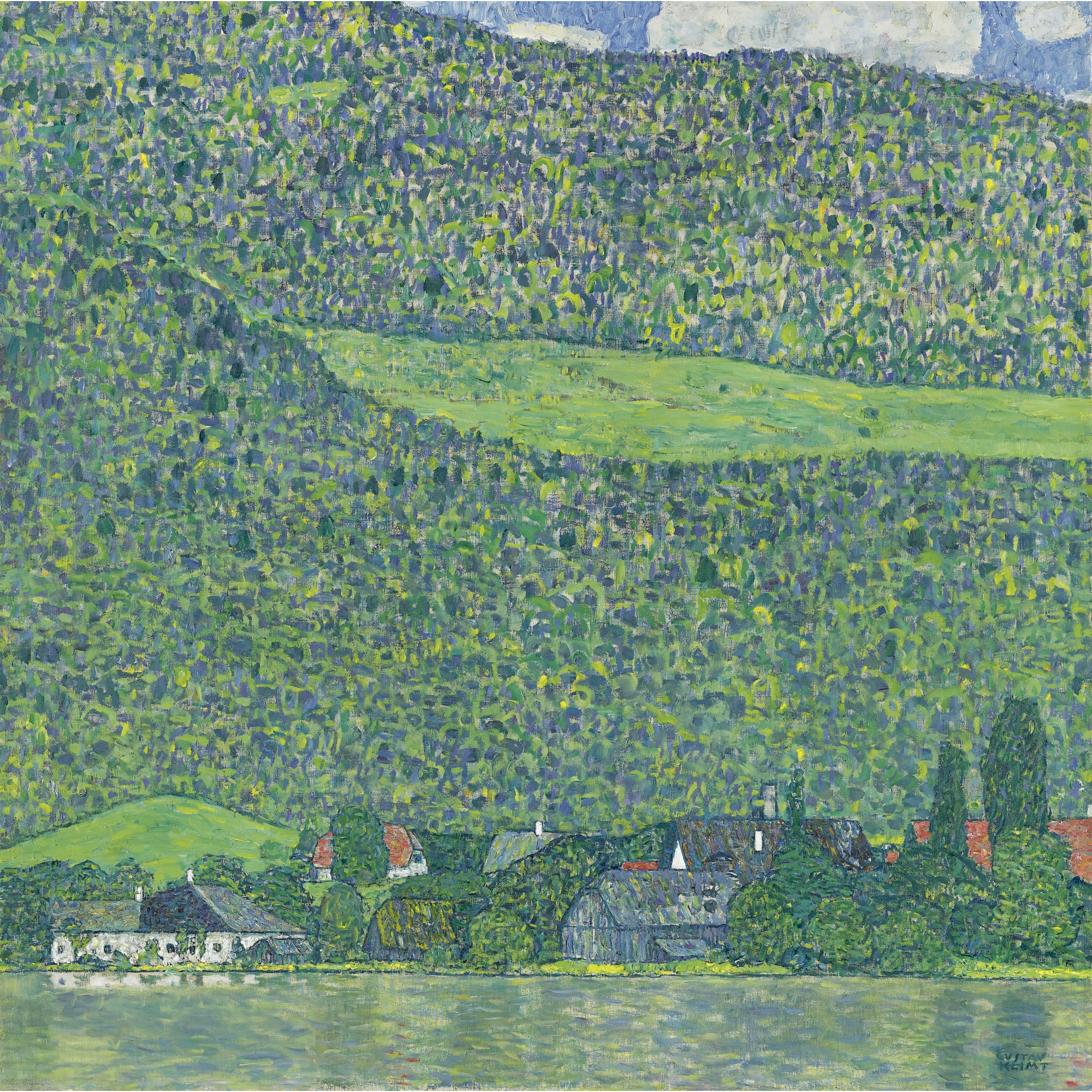
Litzlberg am Attersee, painting by Gustav Klimt (1914/15)

During the Biedermeier period, landscape painters came to the Salzkammergut and the Attersee. Franz Steinfeld and Rudolf von Alt created works depicting the Attersee and its surroundings. With the rise of Impressionism, the charm of the Attersee landscape gained popularity and attracted an increasing number of artists. During the Belle Époque, the Attersee region was a popular Sommerfrische destination and known for its artists’ colonies.

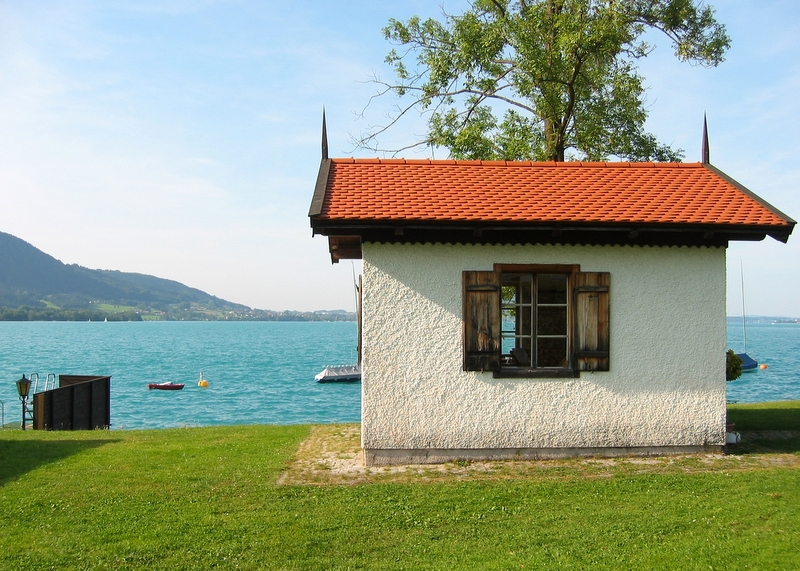
Mahler’s Composing Cottage on the Attersee

From 1900 to 1916, Gustav Klimt spent the summer months at various locations on the Attersee. Among the most popular paintings Klimt created at Attersee are the views of Schloss Kammer, the Litzlberger Keller, Litzlberg Island, and Unterach. The late Impressionist Albert Weisgerber painted his most famous self-portrait there in 1911.

From 1893 to 1896, Gustav Mahler spent the summer months at the Zum Höllengebirge inn in Steinbach am Attersee (in the neighbourhood of Seefeld). He drew inspiration for his compositions from the Attersee landscape and had a small composing cottage built on a meadow in front of the inn on the lakeshore. There, he completed his second symphony in 1894. In 1895–96, he composed his third symphony there.

Christian Attersee (b. 1940) came to Attersee as a sailor and adopted its name as his stage name.

== Other ==
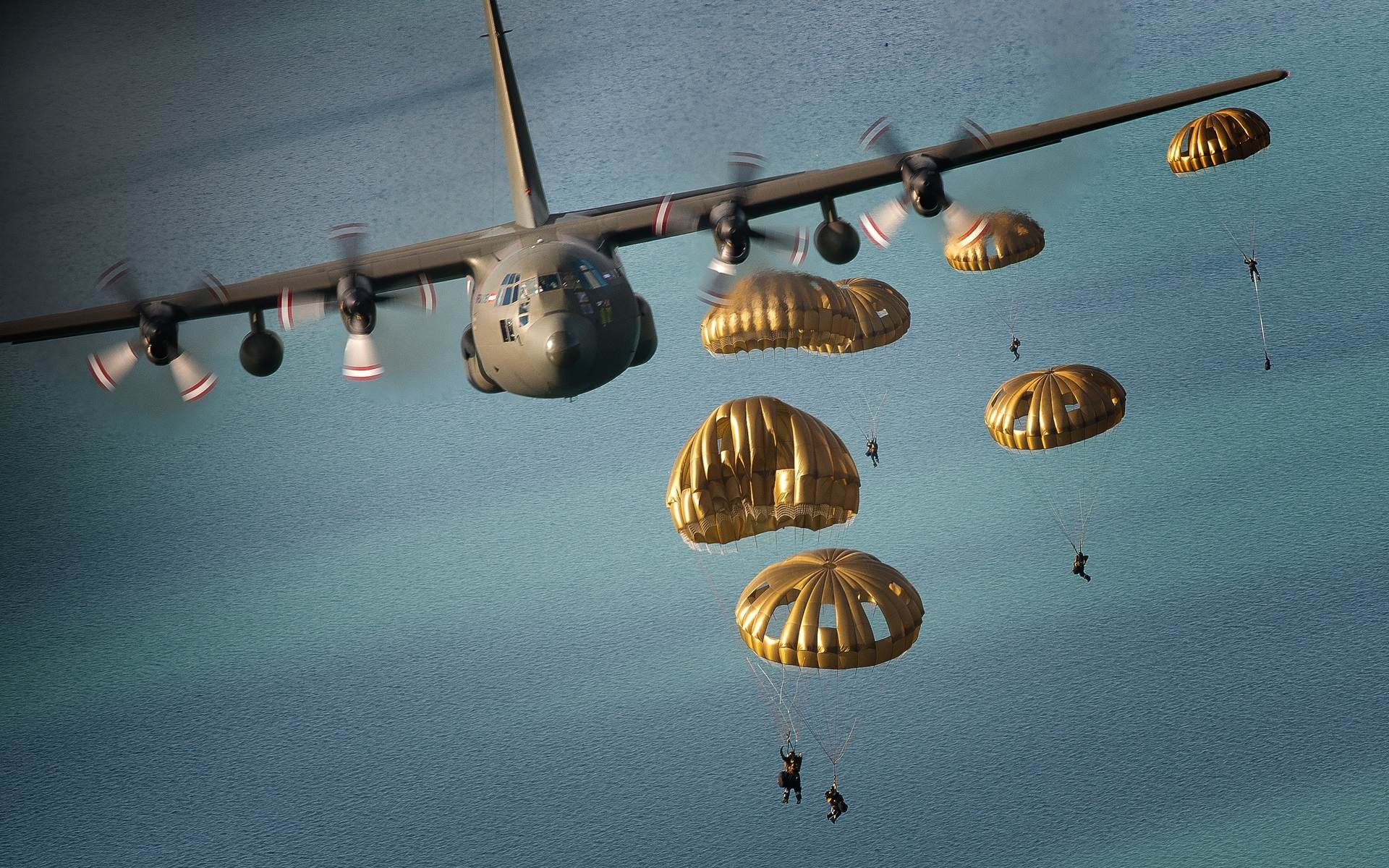
Lockheed C-130 Hercules over Attersee

Attersee is frequently used by the Austrian Air Force as a training site for transport aircraft operations, parachuting, helicopter-supported water rescue operations, as well as supersonic test flights and training.

Around the eastern shore of the lake electromagnetic events are known to occure, these are most often sporadic E propagation in which a radiotelecommunication signal at VHF frequency is transmitted much further than usual via the earth's ionosphere. During summer it has been observed that irish RTÉ Radio 1 occasionally drowns out state ORF Hitradio Ö3 on 88.8 MHz from about 1,600 km (990 mi) away.

Around the lake, a change in architectural style can be observed. Since the mid-20th century, the Attersee has attracted more wealthy residents, which has led to traditional Austrian architectur being steadily replaced by mid-century modern and modern architecture in new constructions. At the same time, a form of gentrification is occurring due to sharply rising land and property prices.

Over the years, multiple rafts, boats, ships, aircraft and a submarine have sunk in Attersee. Every year, several diving accidents and incidents related to diving occur, regularly resulting in the deaths of divers, often from eastern European states. A common cause is the desire of many divers to reach great depths, particularly on the eastern shore of the lake, where the underwater terrain drops nearly vertically to a depth of up to 160 m (520 ft).

== See also ==
Media related to Attersee at Wikimedia Commons
