= Zoeller =

Zoeller or Zöller is a surname. Notable people with the surname include:

- Fuzzy Zoeller (1951–2025), U.S. golfer
- Greg Zoeller (born 1955), attorney general of the U.S. state of Indiana
- Günter Zöller (born 1948), German figure skater and figure skating coach
- Hugo Zöller (1852–1933), German traveler and journalist
- Karlheinz Zöller (1928–2005), German musician and solo flautist of the Berlin Philharmonic from 1960 to 1969 and from 1976 to 1993

Fictional characters:

- Frederick Zöller, character in the film Inglourious Basterds

== See also ==
- Zoller
