= Zeller See Nature Reserve =

Zeller See Nature Reserve or Zellersee Nature Reserve may refer to:

- Zeller See (Kißlegg), nature reserve in the municipality of Kißlegg, county of Ravensburg, Baden-Württemberg, Germany
- Zeller See (Salzburg) Nature Reserve in Salzburger Land, Austria
- Zellersee (Irrsee) Nature Reservein the Salzkammergut, Upper Austria, see Irrsee
- Zeller See Protected Area in Salzburger Land, Austria

== See also ==
- Zeller See (disambiguation)
