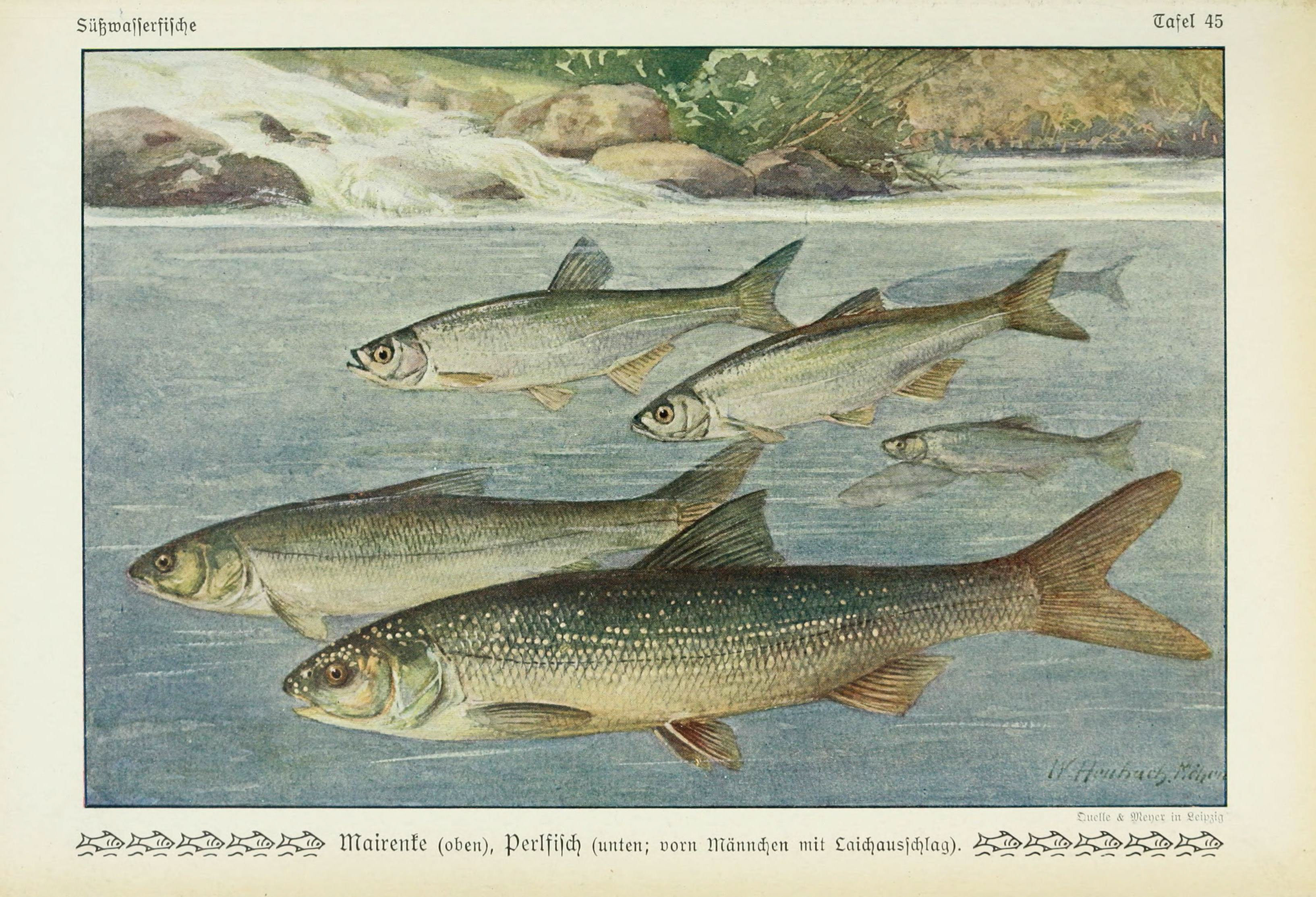

Conservation status
- Near Threatened (IUCN 3.1)

Scientific classification
- Kingdom: Animalia
- Phylum: Chordata
- Class: Actinopterygii
- Order: Cypriniformes
- Family: Leuciscidae
- Subfamily: Leuciscinae
- Genus: Rutilus
- Species: R. meidingeri

Binomial name
- Rutilus meidingeri (Heckel, 1851)

Synonyms
- Rutilus meidingerii Heckel, 1851

= Rutilus meidingeri =

Species of fish

Rutilus meidingeri, the pearlfish, is a species of freshwater ray-finned fish belonging to the family Leuciscidae, which includes the daces, Eurasian minnows and related fishes. This species is currently thought to be endemic to Austria but it may occur in Slovakia or Hungary.

== Taxonomy ==
Rutilus meidingeri was first formally described as Leuciscus meidingeri in 1851 by the Austrian zoologist Johann Jakob Heckel with its type locality given as Atter Lake in Austria. This species is now classified within the genus Rutilus in the subfamily Leuciscinae of the family Leuciscidae.

== Etymology ==
Rutilus meidingeri belongs to the genus Rutilus, a name which means "red, golden red and reddish yellow" and is an allusion to the red colour of the fins of R. rutilus, the type species of the genus. The specific name is an eponym which honours the Austrian aristocrat Carl von Meidinger, who illustrated this species in 1794, although he called it Cyprinus grislagine.

== Description ==
Rutilus meidingeri is told apart from other Roach species in the Danube drainage by its cylindrical body, having between 62 and 67 scales along the lateral line, the abdomen behind the pelvic fins is rounded and males develop nuptial tubercles on the top and sides of their heads. It also has a stout, rounded snout, a subterminal mouth and the fins and iris are grey or yellowish. The dorsal fin has 8 to 9 1/2 branch fin rays. The pearlfish has a maximum total length of 70 cm (28 in) with a maximum weight of 5 kg (11 lb).

== Distribution and habitat ==
Rutilus meidingeri is known with certainty only from subalpine lakes in Austria, although the IUCN state that it is found in the Chiemsee in Bavaria as well as Attersee, Mondsee, Wolfgangsee and Traunsee. It has also been recorded in the Traun river and in the main channel of the Danube. Records in the Danube downstream from Austria are thought to refer to vagrants.
