= Zeller Bach (Irrsee) =

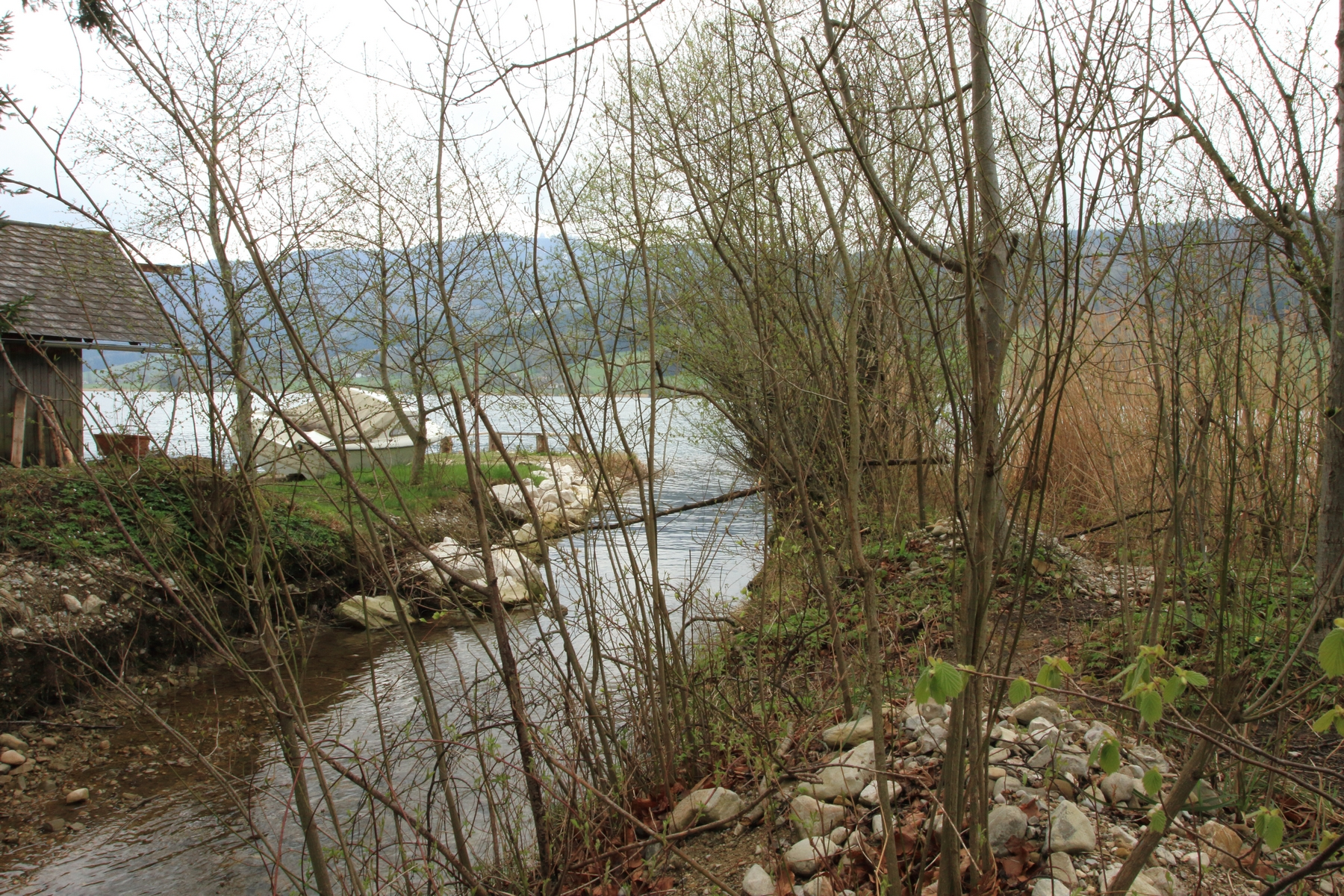
- Mouth of the Zeller Bach

- Location of mouth

Location
- Country: Austria
- State: Upper Austria

Physical characteristics
- Mouth: Irrsee
  - location: Zell am Moos, Vöcklabruck District
  - coordinates: 47°54′07″N 13°18′41″E
- Length: 2.7 km (1.7 mi)

Basin features
- Progression: Zeller Ache→ Seeache→ Ager→ Traun→ Danube→ Black Sea

Zeller Bach is a small river in the Upper Austrian region Salzkammergut. It is a tributary of the Irrsee, which is drained by the Zeller Ache.
