= Zaller =

Zaller is a surname. Notable people with the surname include:

- Lila Bita Zaller (died 2018), Greek-American author, poet, translator, and drama teacher
- John Zaller (born 1949), American political scientist and professor
- Robert Zaller (born 1940), American author

== See also ==
- Zeller (surname)
