= Zeller See =

Zeller See or Zellersee, also Lake Zell in English, may refer to:

- Zeller See (Lake Constance), part of Lower Lake Constance, Baden-Württemberg, Germany
- Lake Zell, a lake in the Pinzgau near Zell am See, Zell am See District, state of Salzburg, Austria
- Zeller See or Irrsee, a lake in the Salzkammergut near Zell am Moos, Vöcklabruck District, Upper Austria, Austria

== See also ==
- Zeller See Nature Reserve (disambiguation)
