= Zeller Bach (Isar) =

River in Germany

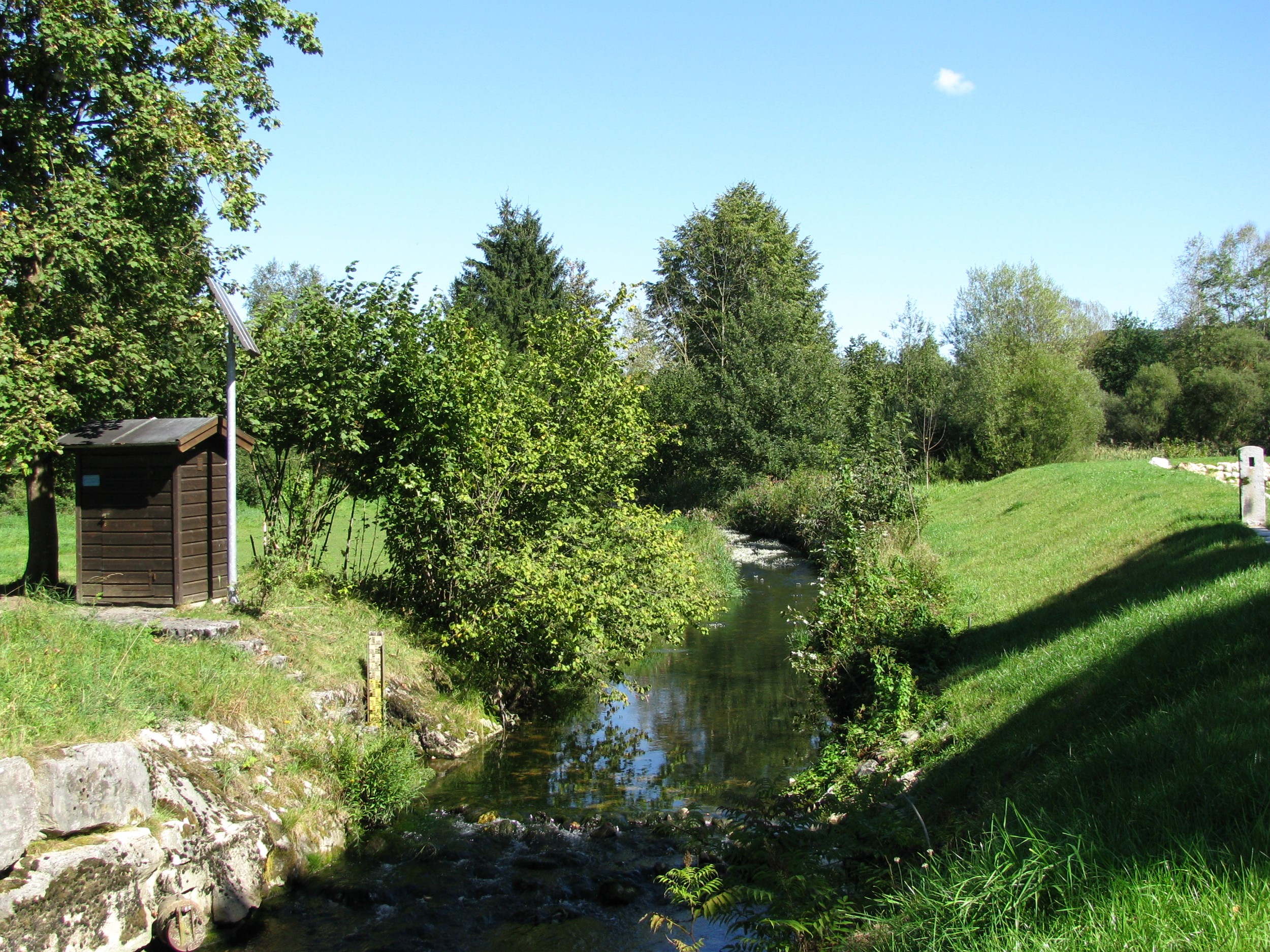
- The Zeller Bach

- Mouth of Zeller Bach

Location
- Country: Germany
- State: Bavaria

Physical characteristics
- Mouth
  - location: Isar
  - coordinates: 47.8470°N 11.5206°E

Basin features
- Progression: Isar→ Danube→ Black Sea

Zeller Bach is a river of Bavaria, Germany. It is a right tributary of the Isar near Dietramszell.

== See also ==
- List of rivers of Bavaria
