= Zeller Ache =

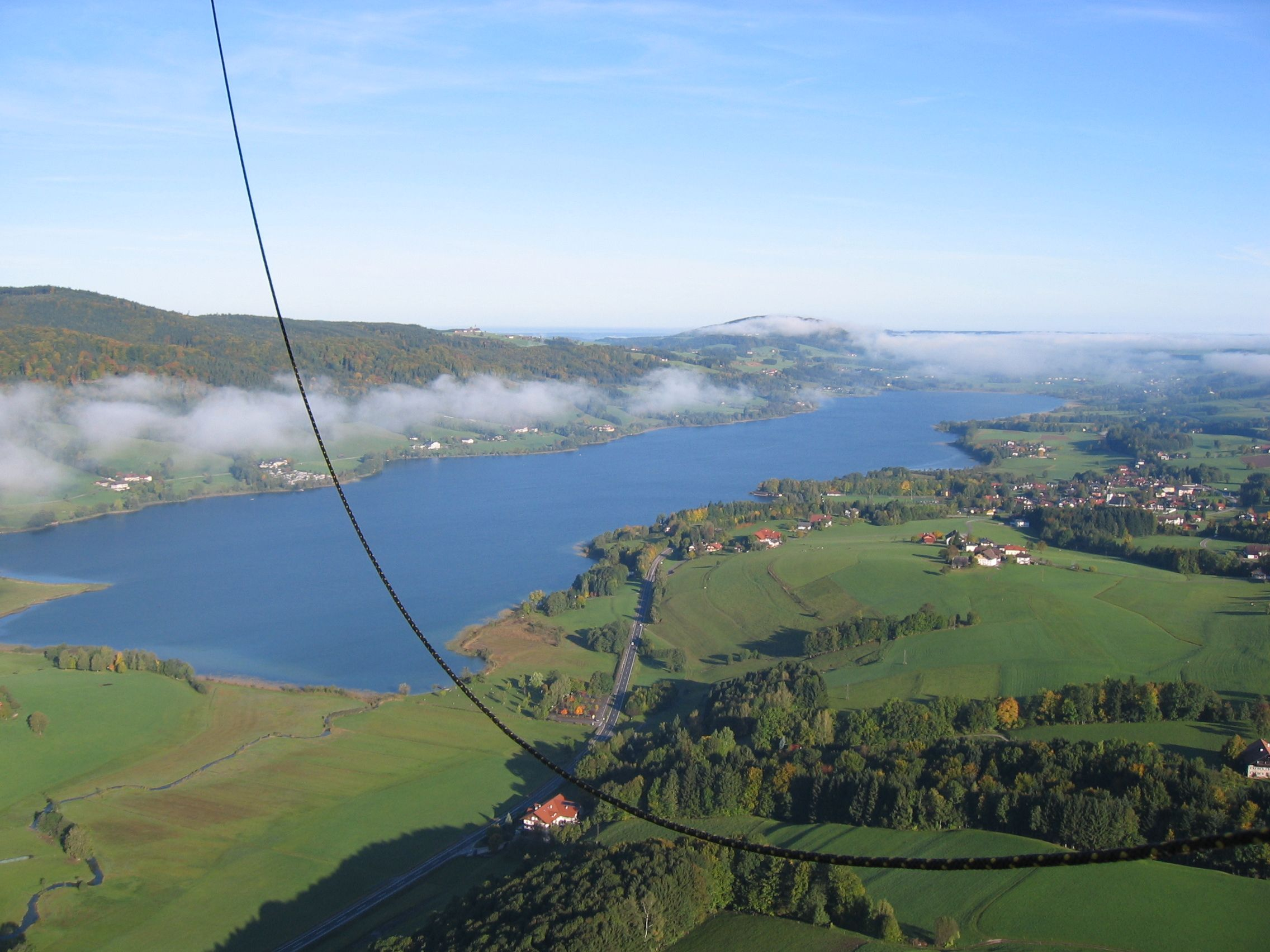
- The Zeller Ache (bottom left) flowing out of lake Irrsee

- Location of mouth

Location
- Country: Austria
- State: Upper Austria

Physical characteristics
- Source
  - location: at the Irrsee
  - coordinates: 47.8909°N 13.3153°E
- Mouth
  - location: into the Mondsee
  - coordinates: 47.8498°N 13.3476°E

Basin features
- Progression: Seeache→ Ager→ Traun→ Danube→ Black Sea

Zeller Ache is a river of Upper Austria.

The Zeller Ache is the outflow of the lake Irrsee. From there it flows into the Mondsee which is drained by the Seeache.
