= Seeache =

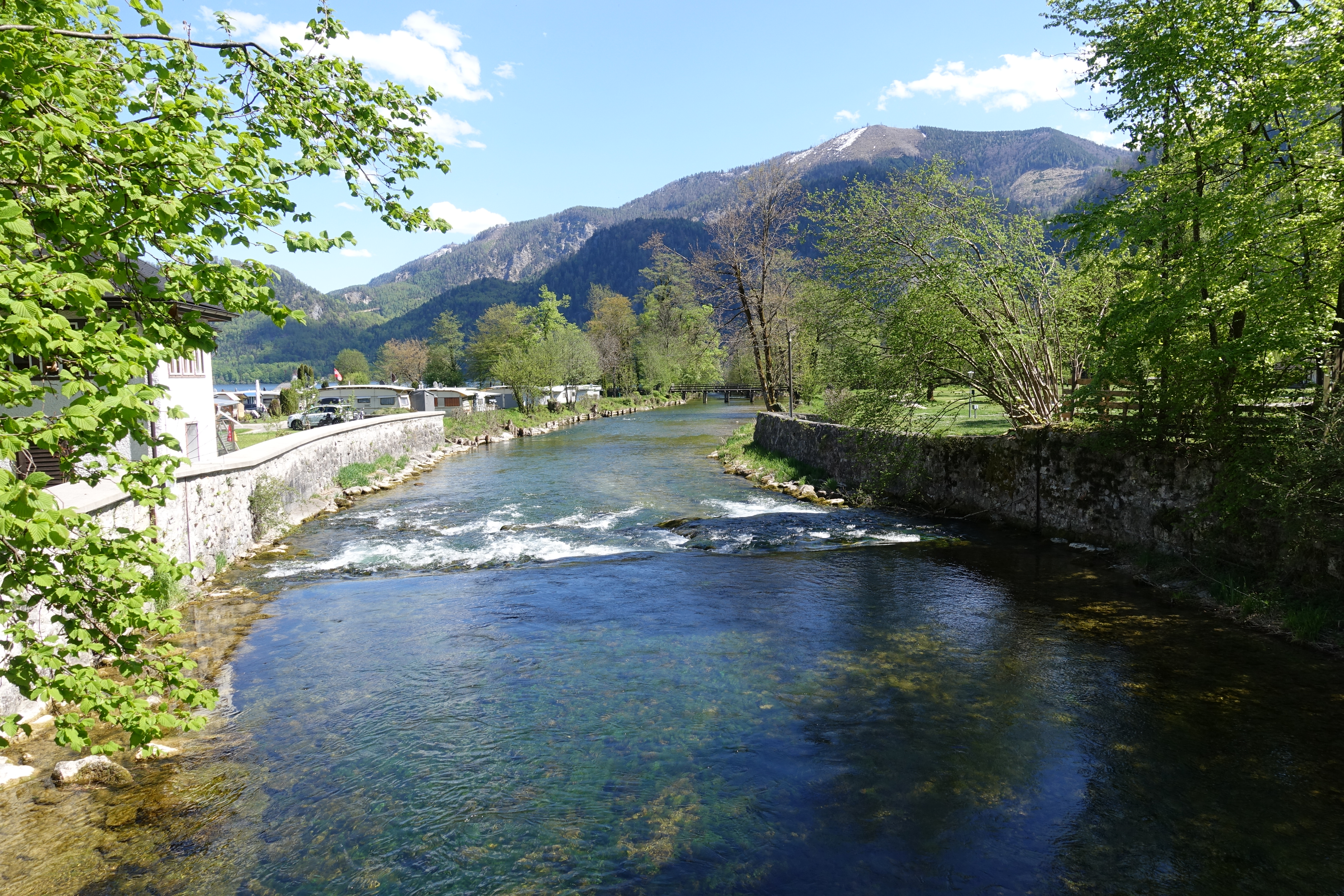
- Seeache in 2021

Location
- Country: Austria
- State: Upper Austria

Physical characteristics
- Source
  - location: Mondsee
  - coordinates: 47°48′14″N 13°27′01″E
- Mouth
  - location: Attersee
  - coordinates: 47.8002°N 13.4843°E
- Length: 2.9 km (1.8 mi)

Basin features
- Progression: Ager→ Traun→ Danube→ Black Sea

The Seeache is a short river of Upper Austria.

The Seeache is the natural outflow of the lake Mondsee and flows after 3 kilometres (1.9 mi) into the lake Attersee, which itself is drained by the Ager.

The rapid river is often used for rafting. The pearl fish (Rutilus meidingerii) has settled in the Seeache.
