= Characeae of Britain and Ireland =

The Characeae or stoneworts are a family of green algae. This is a partial list of species found in Britain and Ireland.

== British Isles ==
Ref: Stewart & Church (1992).

- Chara baltica Bruz.
- Chara canescens Desv. & Lois.
- Chara connivens Salzm. ex A.Braun
- Chara curta Nolta ex Kütz. (=C. aspera var. curta)
- Chara denudata (A.Braun) R.D.Wood
- Chara fragifera Durieu
- Chara intermedia Braun (=C. papillosa Kütz. and C. contraria x hispida)
- Chara mucosa J.Groves & Bullock-Webster
- Chara rudis (A.Braun) Leonh.
- Chara tomentosa L.
- Lamprothamnium papulosum (Wallr.) J.Groves
- Nitella capillaris (Krocker) J.Groves & Bullock-Webster
- Nitella gracilis (Smith) Agardh
- Nitella hyalina (DC.)Agardh
- Nitella mucronata (A.Braun)Miquel
- Nitella spanioclema J.Groves & Bullock-Webster (Nitella flexilis var. spanioclema (J.Groves & Bullock-Webster))
- Nitella tenuissima (Desv.) Kütz.
- Nitellopsis obtusa (Desv.) J.Groves
- Tolypella intricata (Trent. ex Roth) Leonh.
- Tolypella nidifica (O.F.Müll.) Leonh. (=Tolypella nidifica var. nidifica)
- Tolypella prolifera (Ziz. ex A.Braun) Leonh.

== Ireland ==
- County Antrim
  - Chara aspera var. aspera
  - Chara globularis var. globularis
  - Chara vulgaris var. papillata Wallr. ex A. Braun
  - Chara globularis var. virgata (Kützing) R.D.Wood
  - Chara vulgaris var. vulgaris
  - Chara vulgaris var. contraria (A.Braun ex Kützing) J.A. Moore
  - Chara vulgaris var. longibracteata (Kützing) J. Groves & Bullock-Webster
  - Chara vulgaris var. papillata Wallr. ex A. Braun
  - Nitella flexilis var. flexilis
  - Nitella translucens (Pers.) C.A. Ag.
  - Tolypella nidifica var. glomerata (Desv.) R.D.Wood
- County Down
  - Chara aspera var. aspera
  - Chara aspera var. curta (Nolte ex Kützing) Braun ex Leonh.
  - Chara globularis var. globularis
  - Chara vulgaris var. papillata Wallr. ex A. Braun
  - Chara globularis var. virgata (Kützing) R.D.Wood
  - Chara globularis var. annulata (Lilleblad) J.A.Moore
  - Chara hispida L.
  - Chara hispida var. hispida
  - Chara hispida var. major (Hartm.) R.D. Wood
  - Chara hispida var. rudis A. Braun
  - Chara pedunculata Kützing
  - Chara vulgaris var. vulgaris
  - Chara vulgaris var. contraria (A.Braun ex Kützing) J.A. Moore
  - Chara vulgaris var. longibracteata (Kützing) J. Groves & Bullock-Webster
  - Chara vulgaris var. papillata Wallr. ex A. Braun
  - Nitella flexilis var. flexilis
  - Nitella translucens (Pers) C.A. Ag.
  - Tolypella nidifica var. glomerata (Desv.) R.D.Wood
- County Londonderry
  - Chara aspera Deth. ex Willd. var. aspera
  - Chara vulgaris var. papillata Wallr. ex A. Braun
  - Chara globularis var. globularis
  - Chara globularis var. virgata (Kützing) R.D.Wood
  - Chara hispida L.
  - Chara hispida var. hispida
  - Chara vulgaris var. vulgaris
  - Chara vulgaris var. contraria (A.Braun ex Kützing) J.A. Moore
  - Chara vulgaris var. papillata Wallr. ex A. Braun
  - Nitella flexilis var. flexilis
  - Nitella translucens (Pers) C.A. Ag.
  - Tolypella nidifica var. glomerata (Desv.) R.D.Wood
- County Mayo.Recent records have been published from Clare Island.
  - Chara virgata Kützing
  - Nitella flexilis (Linnaeus) C.Agardh
  - Nitella translucens (Persoon) C.Agardh
