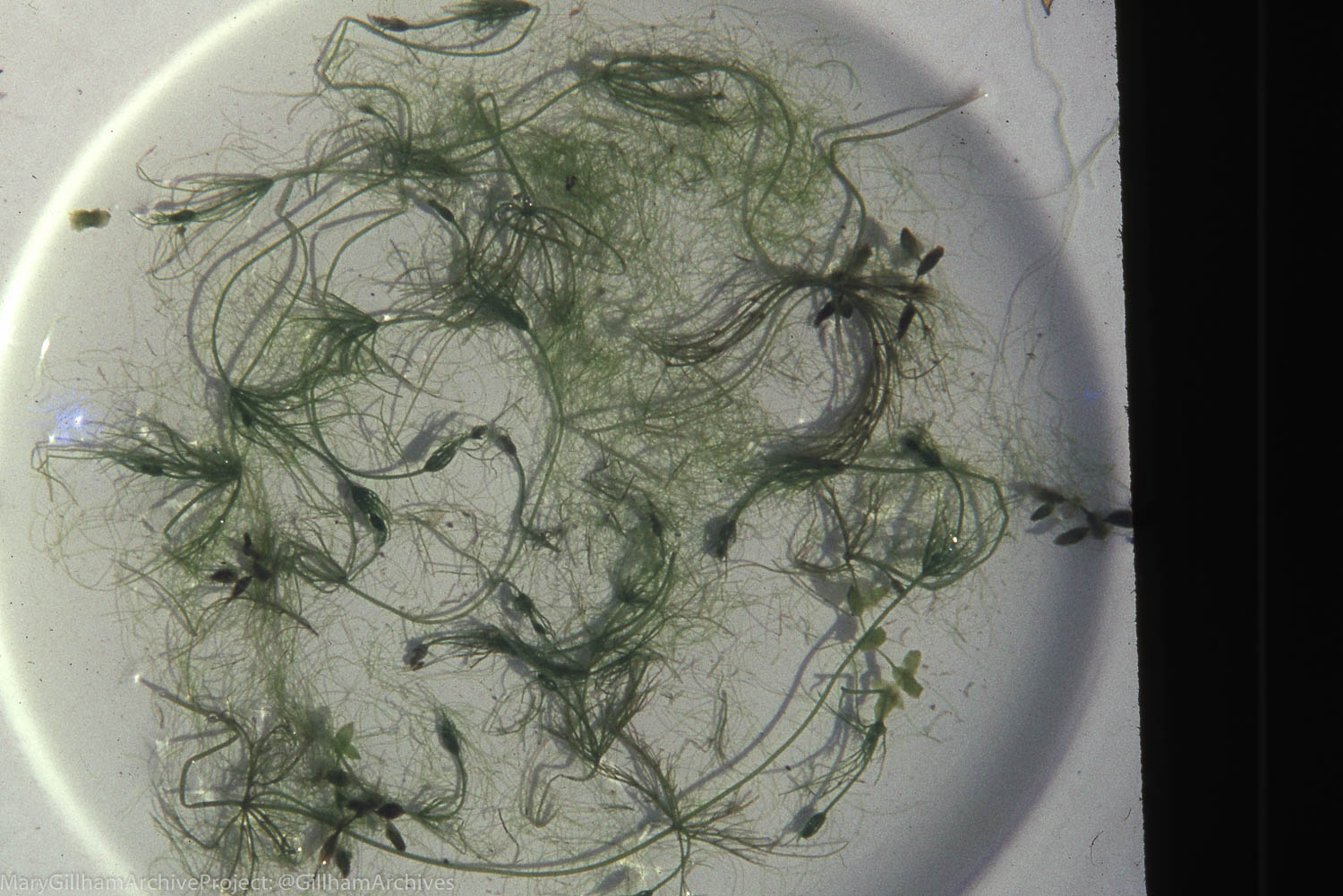
- Nitella opaca from the Whitchurch canal

Scientific classification
- Clade: Viridiplantae
- (unranked): Charophyta
- Class: Charophyceae
- Order: Charales
- Family: Characeae
- Genus: Nitella
- Species: N. opaca

Binomial name
- Nitella opaca (C.Agardh ex Bruzelius) C.Agardh

= Nitella opaca =

Species of alga

Nitella opaca is a species of algae in the family Characeae.

== Description ==
Nitella opaca is a dioecious species very similar to Nitella flexilis and difficult to distinguish from it.

== Distribution ==
Nitella opaca has been observed in fresh waters, mostly lakes. Can be found up to 12 m deep.

== Etymology ==
From the Latin adjective opaca, meaning "opaque", "not shining".
