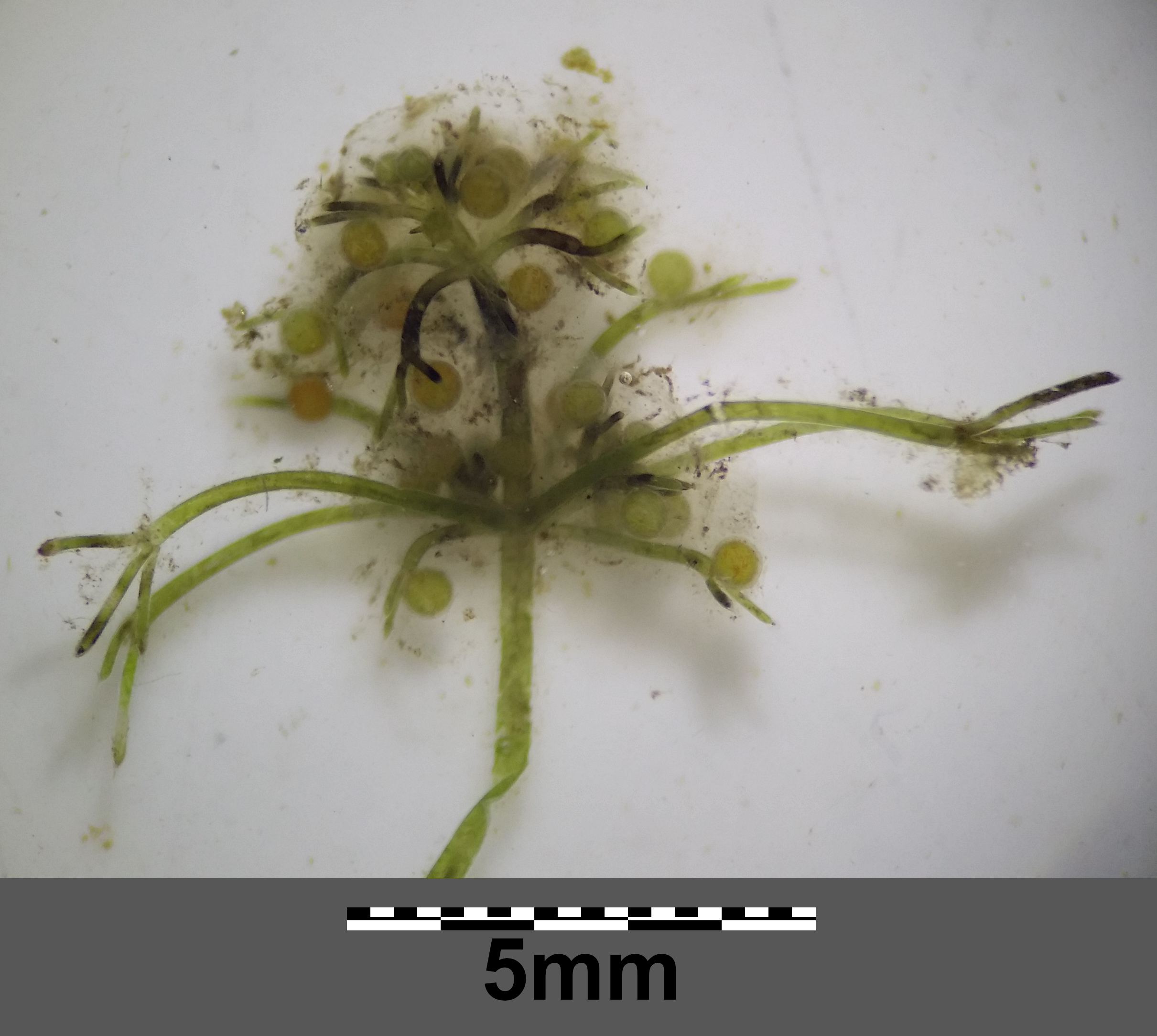

Scientific classification
- Clade: Viridiplantae
- (unranked): Charophyta
- Class: Charophyceae
- Order: Charales
- Family: Characeae
- Genus: Nitella
- Species: N. syncarpa

Binomial name
- Nitella syncarpa (Thuillier) Chevallier, 1827

= Nitella syncarpa =

Species of alga

Nitella syncarpa is a species of stonewort belonging to the family Characeae.

Synonym:

- Chara syncarpa Thuillier (= basionym)
