= Chara baueri =

Scientific classification
- Clade: Viridiplantae
- (unranked): Charophyta
- Class: Charophyceae
- Order: Charales
- Family: Characeae
- Genus: Chara
- Species: C. baueri

Binomial name
- Chara baueri A.Braun, 1847

Species of alga

Chara baueri is a species of alga belonging to the family Characeae.

It has almost cosmopolitan distribution.
