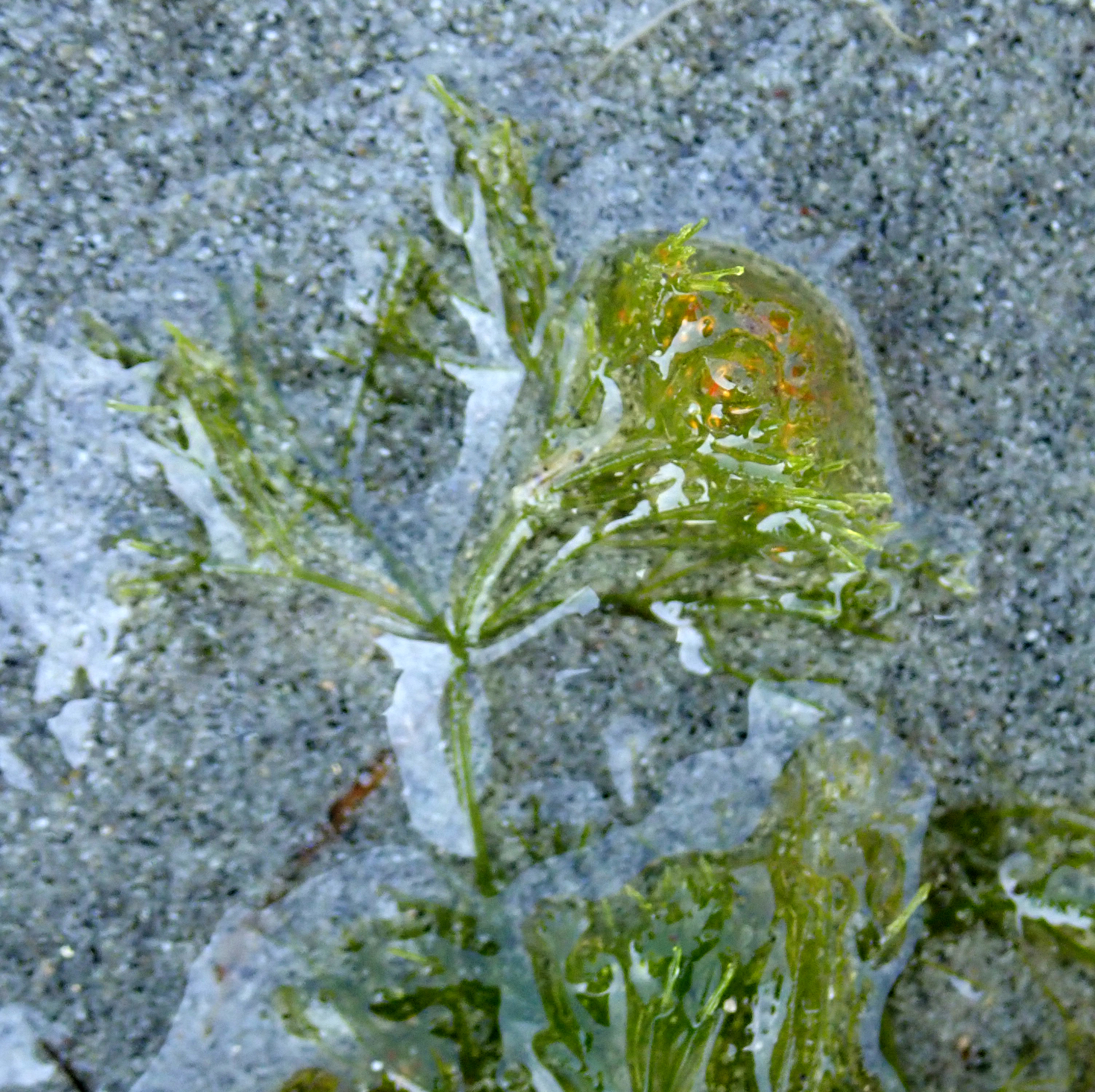

Conservation status
- Least Concern (IUCN 3.1)

Scientific classification
- Kingdom: Plantae
- Division: Charophyta
- Class: Charophyceae
- Order: Charales
- Family: Characeae
- Genus: Nitella
- Species: N. pseudoflabellata

Binomial name
- Nitella pseudoflabellata A. Braun

= Nitella pseudoflabellata =

Species of algae

Nitella pseudoflabellata is a species of algae native to southwestern Australia and New Zealand.

== Description ==
Nitella pseudoflabellata is a species of algae that belongs to the genus Nitella. Its appearance is similar to many other Nitella species.

== Range ==
Nitella pseudoflabellata is mostly located in coastal areas of Australia and New Zealand, although some instances of the species have been recorded in China, the Indian state of Tamil Nadu, Thailand and Japan.

== Habitat ==
It is endemic to freshwater deposits in inland regions and wetlands.

== Etymology ==
The pseudo- prefix means not genuine/false, while the -flabellata suffix in Latin is an inflection of flabellatus, meaning fan-shaped.

== Taxonomy ==
Nitella pseudoflabellata belongs to the Characeae family.
