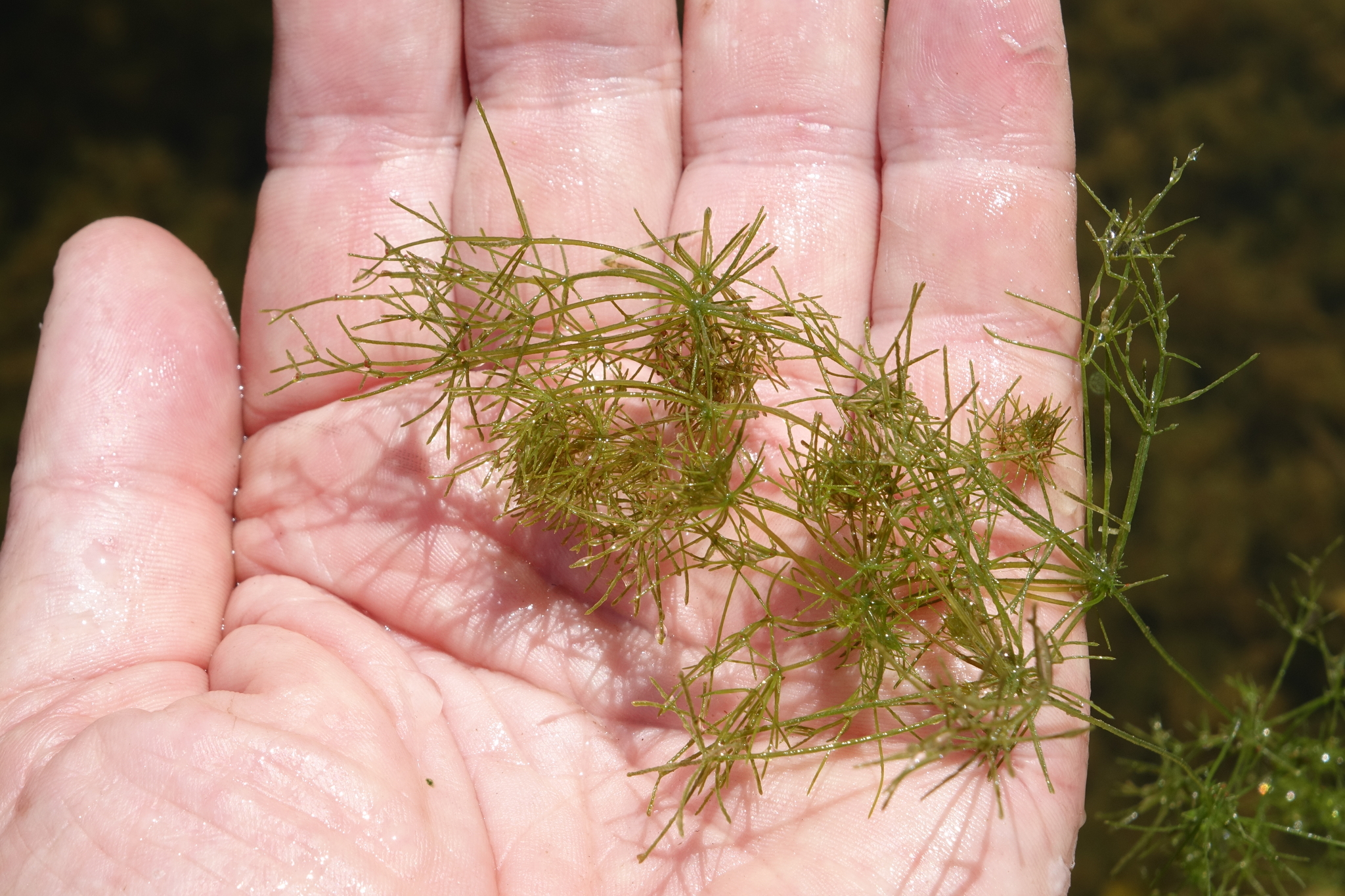

Scientific classification
- Clade: Viridiplantae
- (unranked): Charophyta
- Class: Charophyceae
- Order: Charales
- Family: Characeae
- Genus: Lychnothamnus
- Species: L. barbatus

Binomial name
- Lychnothamnus barbatus (Meyen) Leonhardi, 1863

= Lychnothamnus barbatus =

Species of alga

Lychnothamnus barbatus is a species of alga belonging to the family Characeae.

It has almost cosmopolitan distribution.
