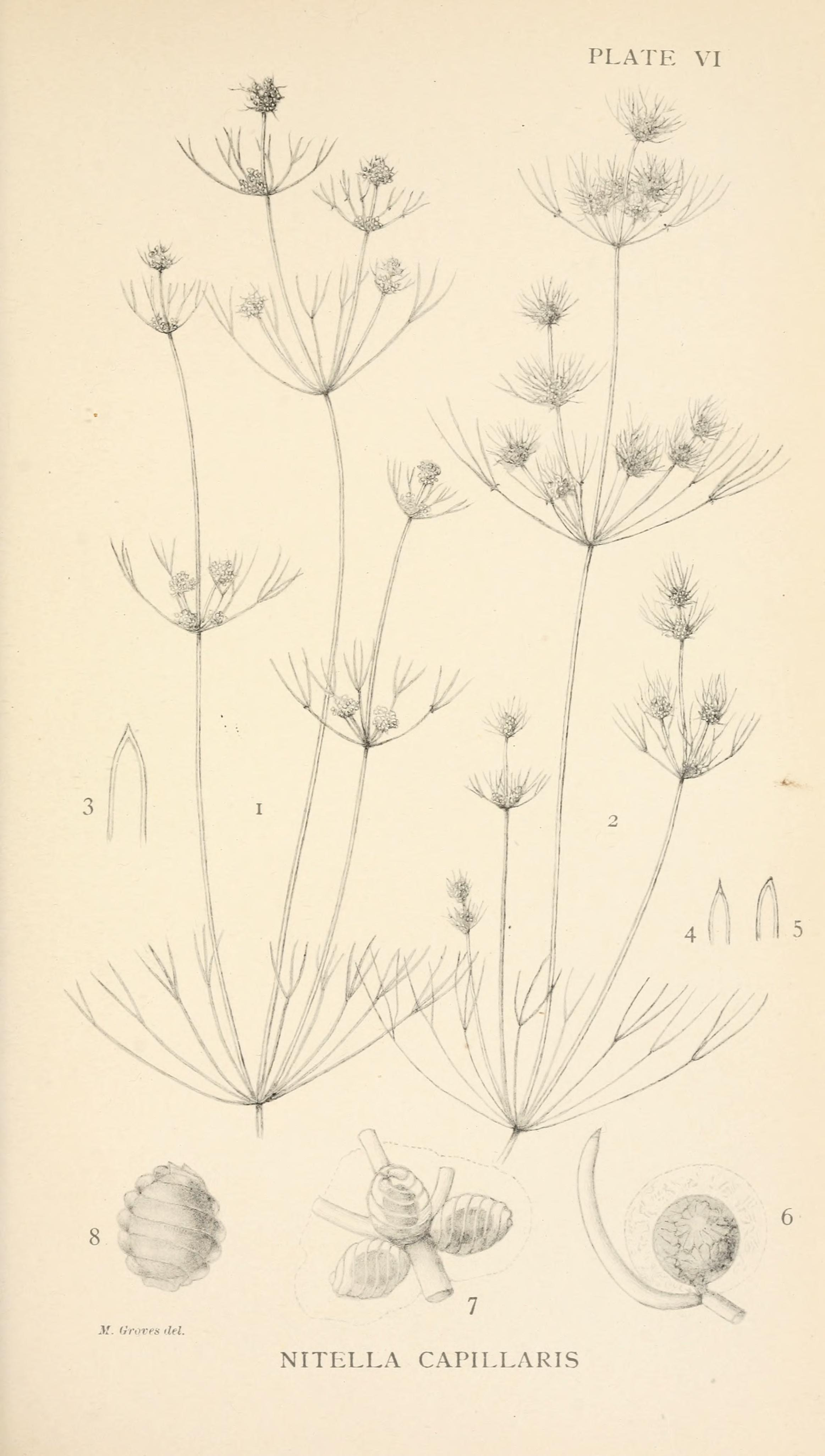

Scientific classification
- Clade: Viridiplantae
- (unranked): Charophyta
- Class: Charophyceae
- Order: Charales
- Family: Characeae
- Genus: Nitella
- Species: N. capillaris

Binomial name
- Nitella capillaris (Krock.) J.Groves & Bull.-Webst.

= Nitella capillaris =

Species of alga

Nitella capillaris is a species of stonewort belonging to the family Characeae.

It is native to Europe and Northern America.
