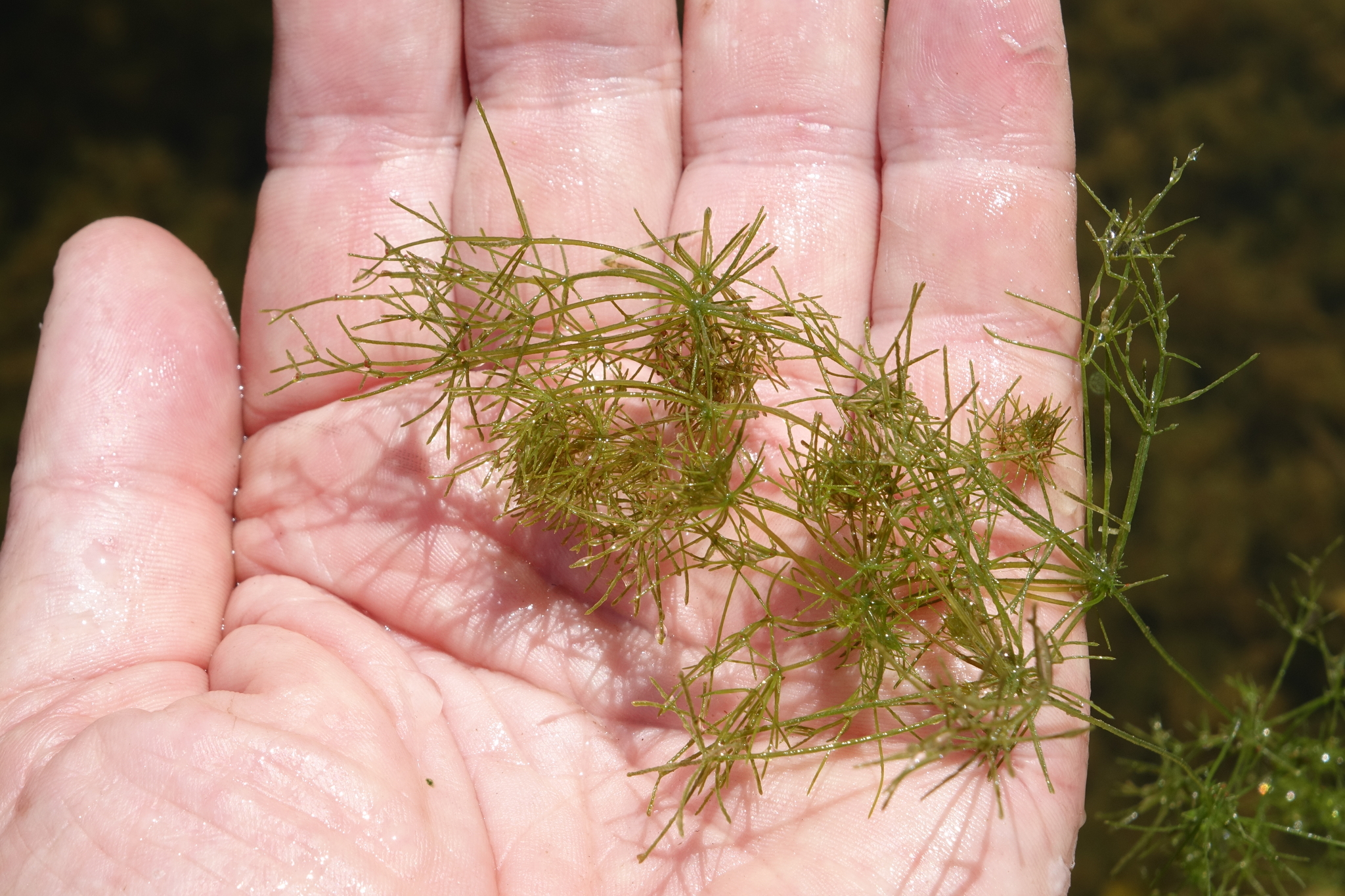
- Lychnothamnus barbatus

Scientific classification
- Clade: Viridiplantae
- (unranked): Charophyta
- Class: Charophyceae
- Order: Charales
- Family: Characeae
- Genus: Lychnothamnus (Ruprecht) A.Braun, 1856

= Lychnothamnus =

Genus of algae

Lychnothamnus is a genus of stoneworts belonging to the family Characeae.

The species of this genus are found in Europe, Australia and Northern America.

Species:

- Lychnothamnus barbatus (L.Meyen) Leonh., 1863
