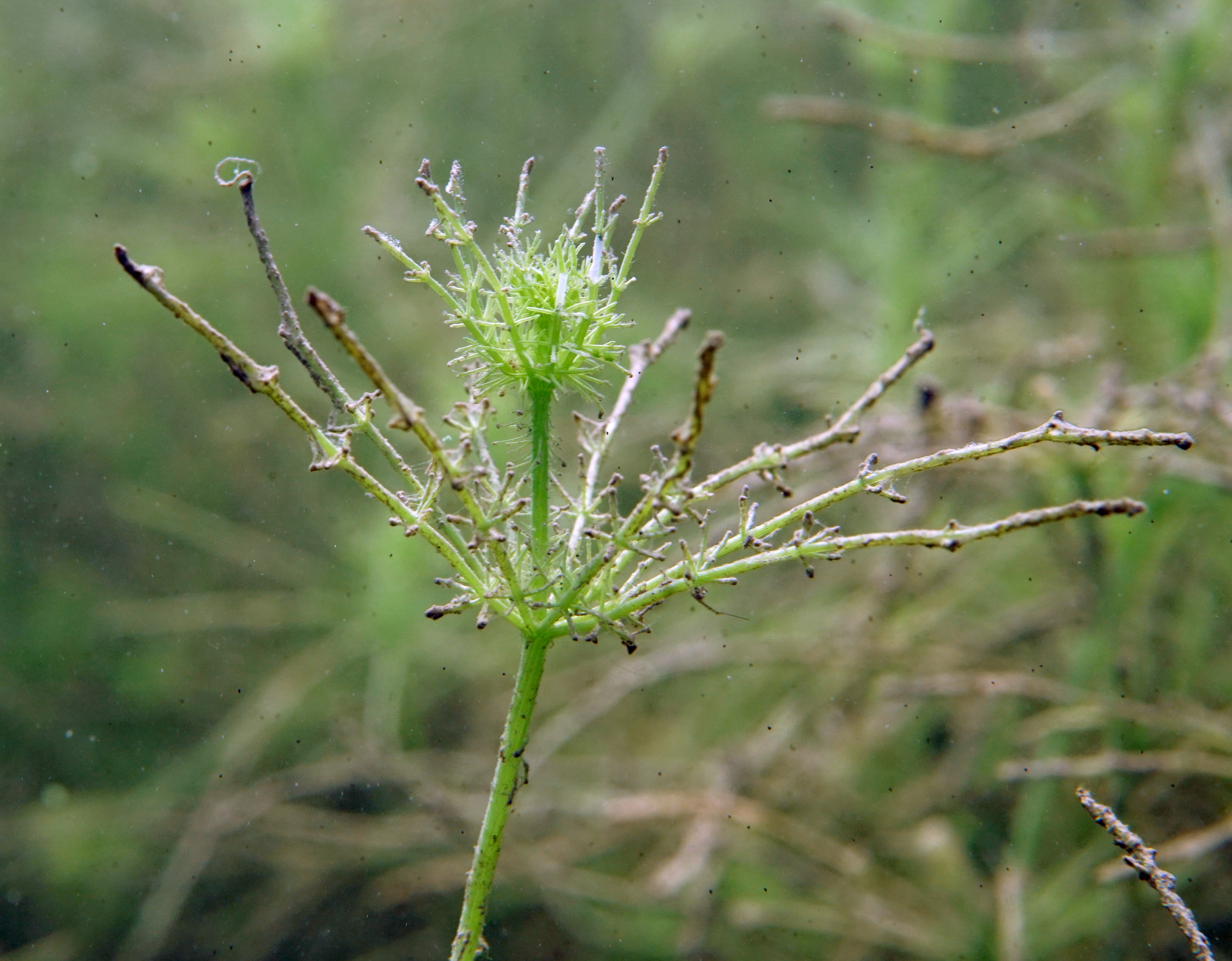

Scientific classification
- Domain: Eukaryota
- Clade: Archaeplastida
- Clade: Viridiplantae
- Division: Charophyta
- Class: Charophyceae
- Order: Charales
- Family: Characeae
- Genus: Chara
- Species: C. hispida

Binomial name
- Chara hispida L., 1753

= Chara hispida =

Species of alga

Chara hispida, the bristly stonewort, is a green alga species in the genus Chara. With 30 to 200 cm height and a stem diameter of 2–3 mm, it is one of the biggest Chara species in Europe.

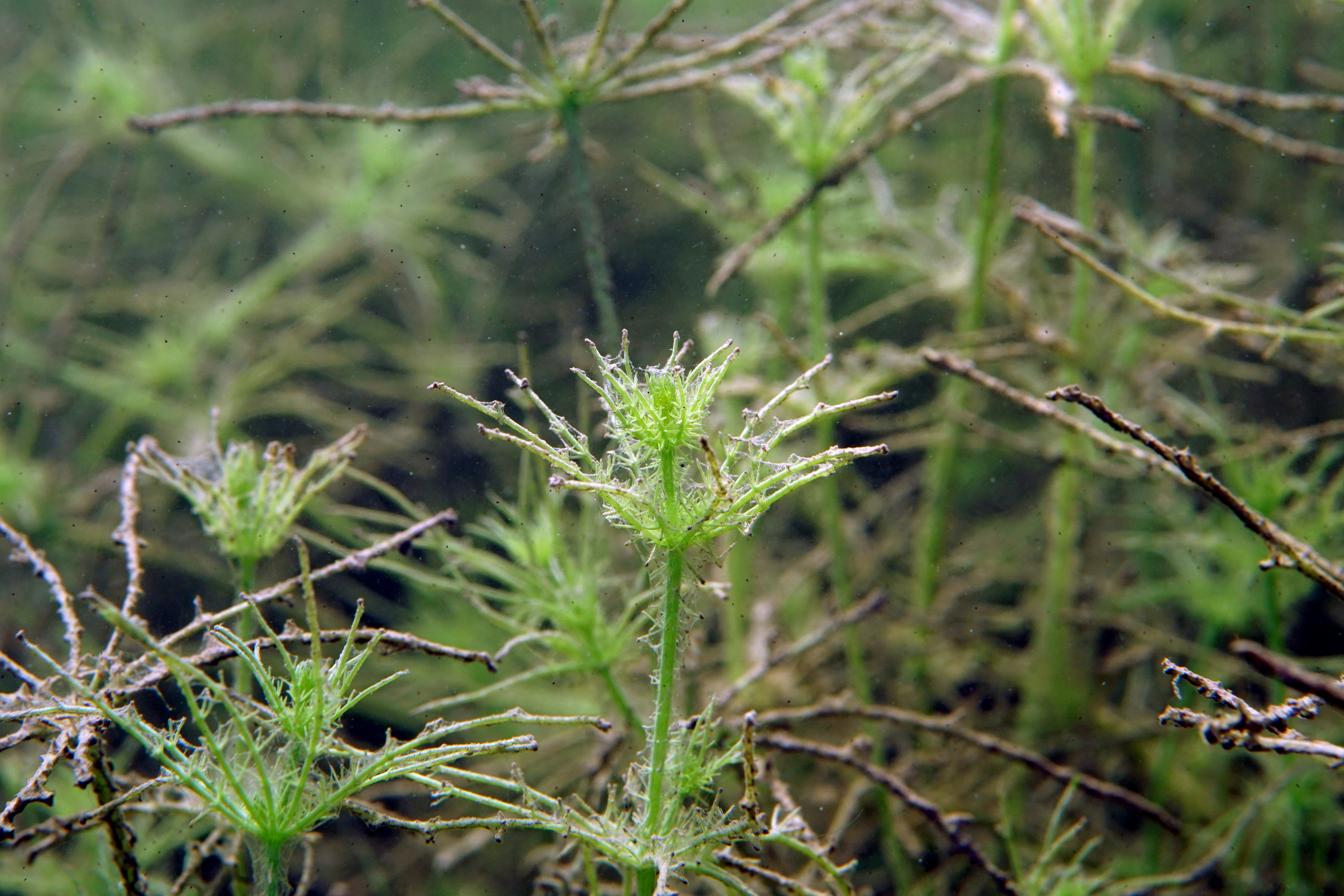
Chara hispida often forms patches without other species
