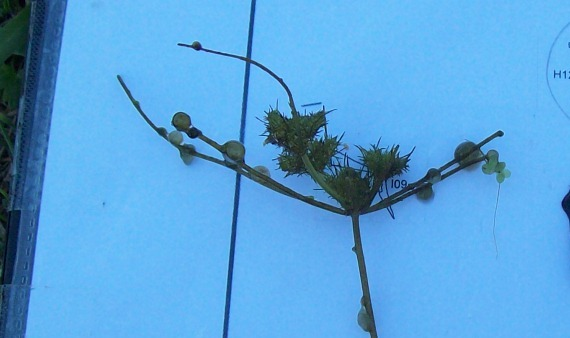

Scientific classification
- Clade: Viridiplantae
- (unranked): Charophyta
- Class: Charophyceae
- Order: Charales
- Family: Characeae
- Genus: Tolypella
- Species: T. prolifera

Binomial name
- Tolypella prolifera (Ziz ex A.Braun) Leonhardi, 1863

= Tolypella prolifera =

Species of alga

Tolypella prolifera is a species of stonewort belonging to the family Characeae.

Synonym:

- Chara prolifera Ziz ex A.Braun, 1834 (= basionym)
