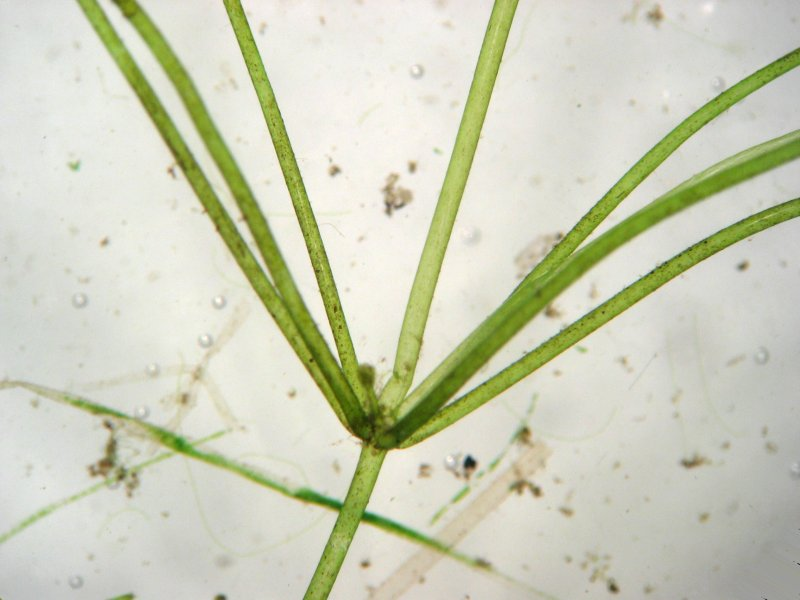

Conservation status
- Least Concern (IUCN 3.1)

Scientific classification
- Kingdom: Plantae
- Division: Charophyta
- Class: Charophyceae
- Order: Charales
- Family: Characeae
- Genus: Nitella
- Species: N. mucronata

Binomial name
- Nitella mucronata (A.Braun) Miq.

= Nitella mucronata =

Species of alga

Nitella mucronata is a species of stonewort belonging to the family Characeae.

It has cosmopolitan distribution.
