= Tolypella nidifica =

Scientific classification
- Clade: Viridiplantae
- (unranked): Charophyta
- Class: Charophyceae
- Order: Charales
- Family: Characeae
- Genus: Tolypella
- Species: T. nidifica

Binomial name
- Tolypella nidifica (O.F.Müll.) Leonh.

Species of alga

Tolypella nidifica is a species of stonewort belonging to the family Characeae.

It has almost cosmopolitan distribution.
