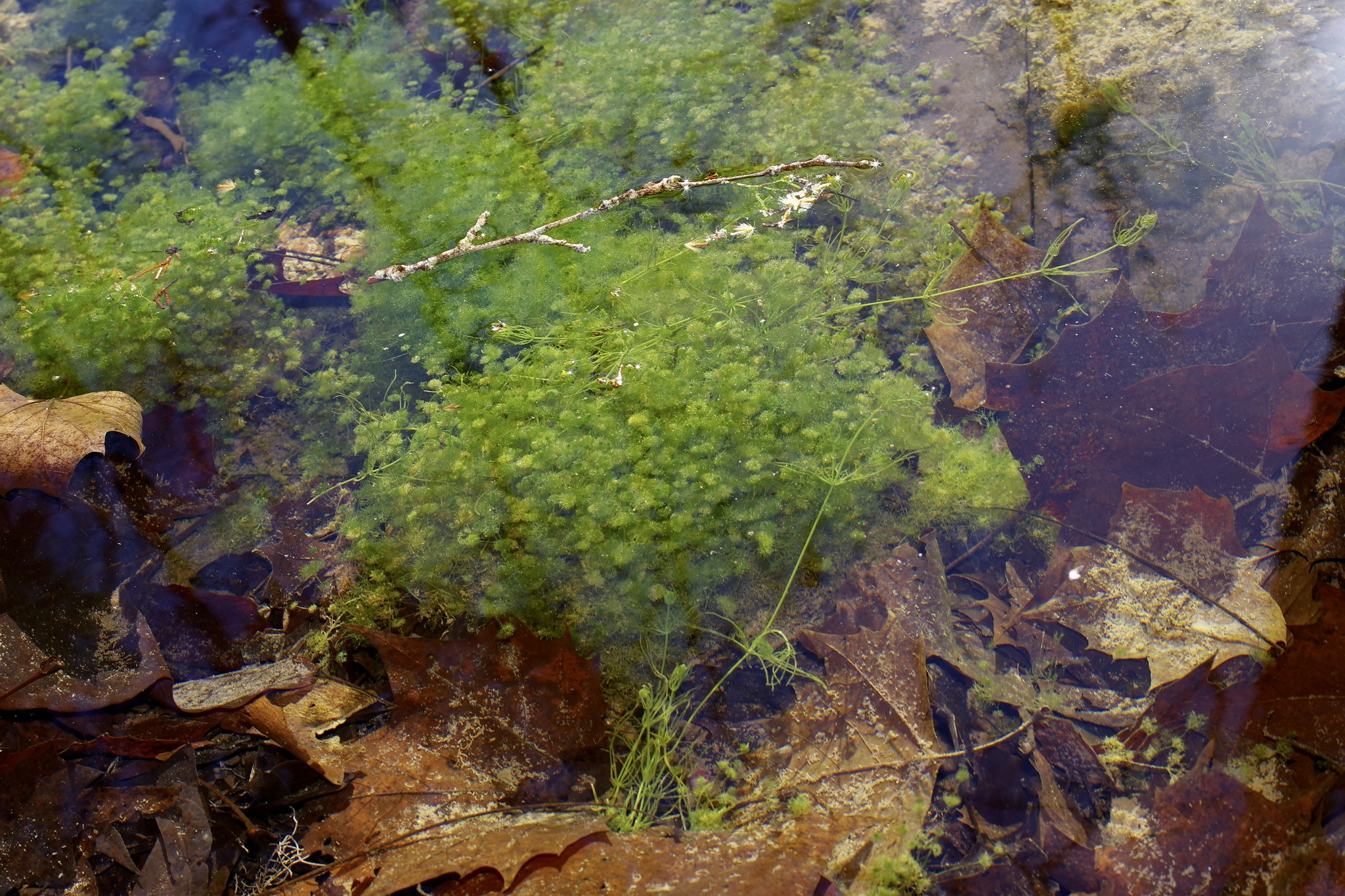

Conservation status
- Least Concern (IUCN 3.1)

Scientific classification
- Kingdom: Plantae
- Division: Charophyta
- Class: Charophyceae
- Order: Charales
- Family: Characeae
- Genus: Nitella
- Species: N. tenuissima

Binomial name
- Nitella tenuissima (Desvaux) Kützing, 1843

= Nitella tenuissima =

Species of alga

Nitella tenuissima is a species of alga belonging to the family Characeae.

It has cosmopolitan distribution.
