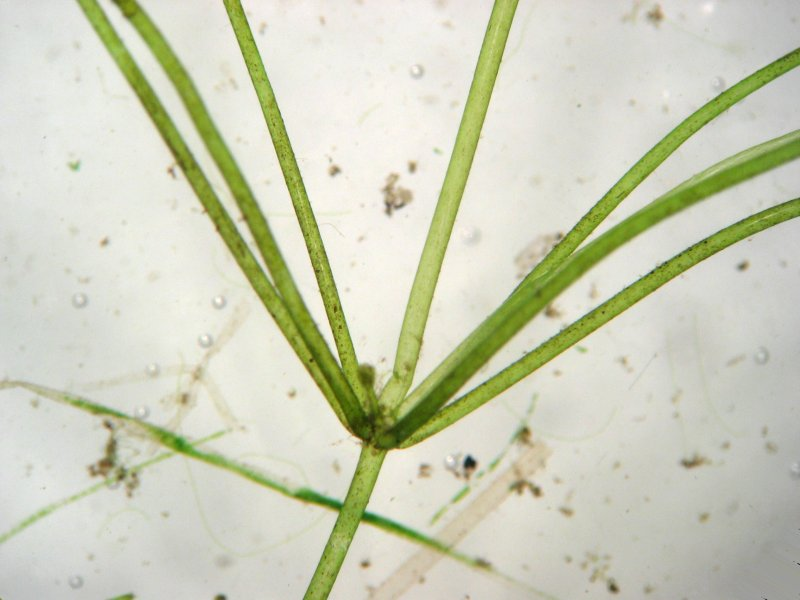
- Nitella mucronata

Scientific classification
- Clade: Viridiplantae
- (unranked): Charophyta
- Class: Charophyceae
- Order: Charales
- Family: Characeae
- Genus: Nitella; C.Agardh, 1824

Species
- See text.

= Nitella =

Genus of algae

Nitella is a genus of charophyte green algae in the family Characeae.

== Species ==
The species in the genus include:

- Nitella abyssinica A. Braun
- Nitella acuminata A. Braun ex Wallman
- Nitella aemula A. Braun
- Nitella annandalei B.P. Pal
- Nitella australiensis (F.M. Bailey) J.C. van Raam
- Nitella axillaris A. Braun
- Nitella axilliformis Imahori
- Nitella capillaris (A.J.Krocker) J.Groves & G.R.Bullock-Webster
- Nitella comptonii J. Groves
- Nitella cristata A. Braun
- Nitella diffusa A. Braun
- Nitella flexilis (Linnaeus) C. Agardh
- Nitella furcata (Roxburgh ex Bruzelius) C. Agardh
- Nitella gelatinifera R.D. Wood
- Nitella gelatinosa A. Braun
- Nitella gloeostachys A. Braun
- Nitella gracilens Morioka
- Nitella gracilis (J.E.Smith) C.Agardh
- Nitella gracillima T.F. Allen
- Nitella haagenii J.C. van Raam
- Nitella heterophylla A. Braun
- Nitella hookeri A. Braun
- Nitella horikawae Imahori
- Nitella hyalina (De Candolle) C. Agardh
- Nitella ignescens García
- Nitella imahorii R.D. Wood
- Nitella imperialis (Allen) Sakayama
- Nitella inversa Imahori
- Nitella leonhardii R.D. Wood
- Nitella leptoclada A. Braun
- Nitella leptostachys A. Braun
- Nitella megaspora (J. Groves) H. Sakayama
- Nitella mirabilis Nordstedt ex J. Groves
- Nitella moniliformis Zaneveld
- Nitella monopodiata J.C. van Raam
- Nitella moriokae R.D. Wood
- Nitella morongii T.F. Allen
- Nitella mucronata (A.Braun) F.Miquel
- Nitella myriotricha A. Braun ex Kützing
- Nitella obtusa T.F.Allen
- Nitella oligospira A. Braun
- Nitella opaca C. Agardh ex Bruzelius
- Nitella ornithopoda A. Braun
- Nitella penicillata A. Braun
- Nitella polycephala Kützing
- Nitella praelonga A. Braun
- Nitella pseudoflabellata A. Braun
- Nitella pulchella Allen
- Nitella sonderi A. Braun
- Nitella spanioclema J. Groves & Bullock-Webster ex Bullock-Webster
- Nitella spiciformis Morioka
- Nitella stuartii A. Braun
- Nitella subtilissima A. Braun
- Nitella syncarpa (J.L.Thuillier) Kützing
- Nitella tasmanica Müller ex A.Braun
- Nitella tenuissima (Desvaux) Kützing
- Nitella terrestris M.Iyengar
- Nitella translucens (Persoon) C. Agardh
- Nitella tricellularis (Nordst.) Nordst. in T.F.Allen, em. R.D. Wood
- Nitella tumida Nordstedt
- Nitella tumulosa Zaneveld
- Nitella ungula García
- Nitella verticillata (N.Filarszky & G.O.Allen ex Filarszky) R.D.Wood
- Nitella vieillardii (A.Braun) Sakayama
- Nitella virgata Wallman
- Nitella wahlbergiana Wallman
- Nitella woodii Hotchkiss & Imahori
- Nitella zamanii Naz, Diba & Schubert
- Nitella zeyheri A.Braun ex Kützing
- Nitella zollingeri (A.Braun) R.D.Wood
