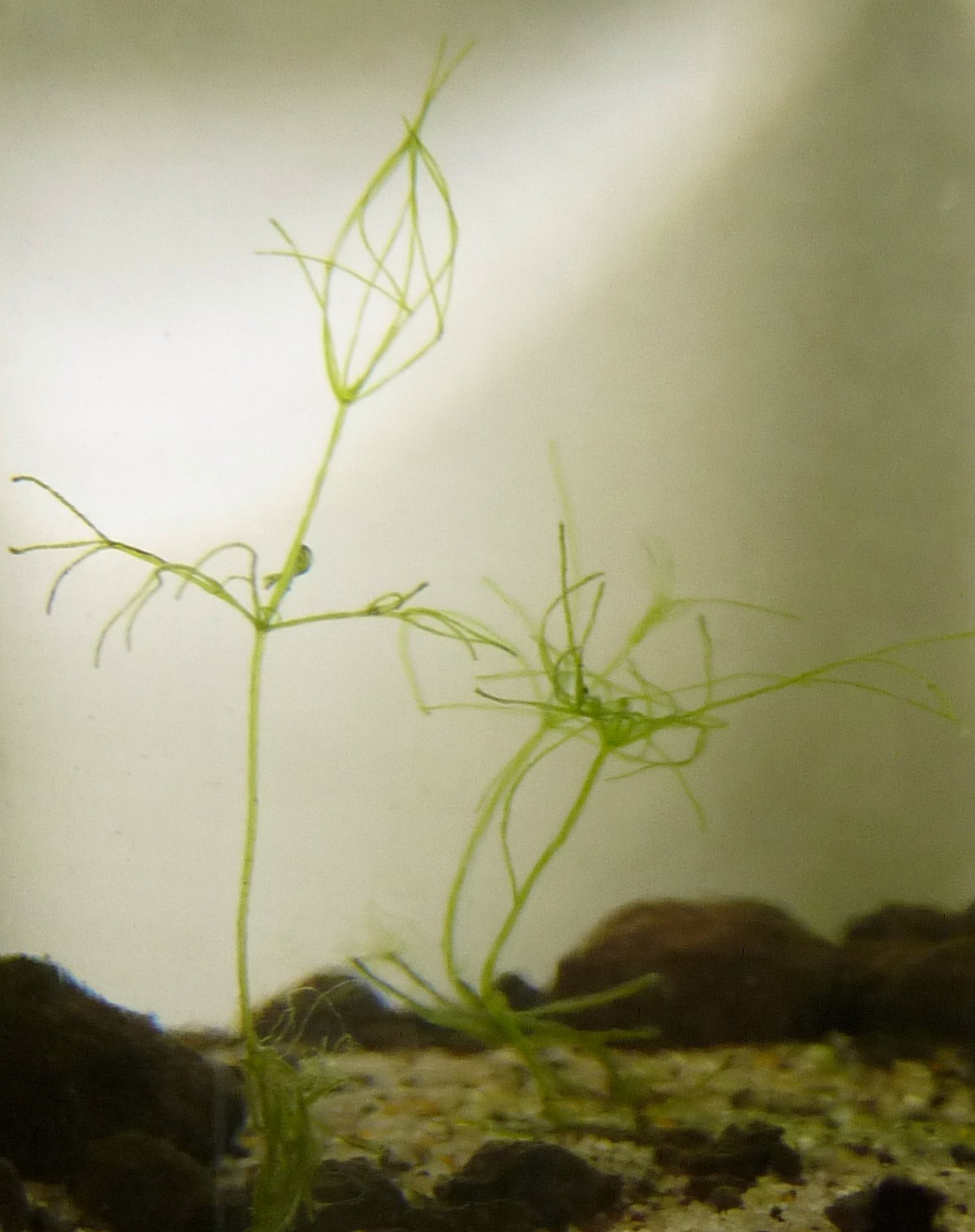

Conservation status
- Least Concern (IUCN 3.1)

Scientific classification
- Kingdom: Plantae
- Division: Charophyta
- Class: Charophyceae
- Order: Charales
- Family: Characeae
- Genus: Nitella
- Species: N. flexilis

Binomial name
- Nitella flexilis (L.) C.Agardh

= Nitella flexilis =

Species of alga

Nitella flexilis, the smooth stonewort, is a freshwater species of characean algae that is used as a model organism for its large cell size and relative ease of cultivation in the laboratory.

== Description ==
A robust species growing up to a meter long with axes up to 1mm wide. Branches in whorls once or twice divided.

== Distribution ==
The species occurs on all continents of the world except Australia. It has been recorded from several counties in Ireland. From the Eglinton Canal in Galway; and in Counties Down and Londonderry; River Dorree in Clare Island Co. Mayo 2004.
