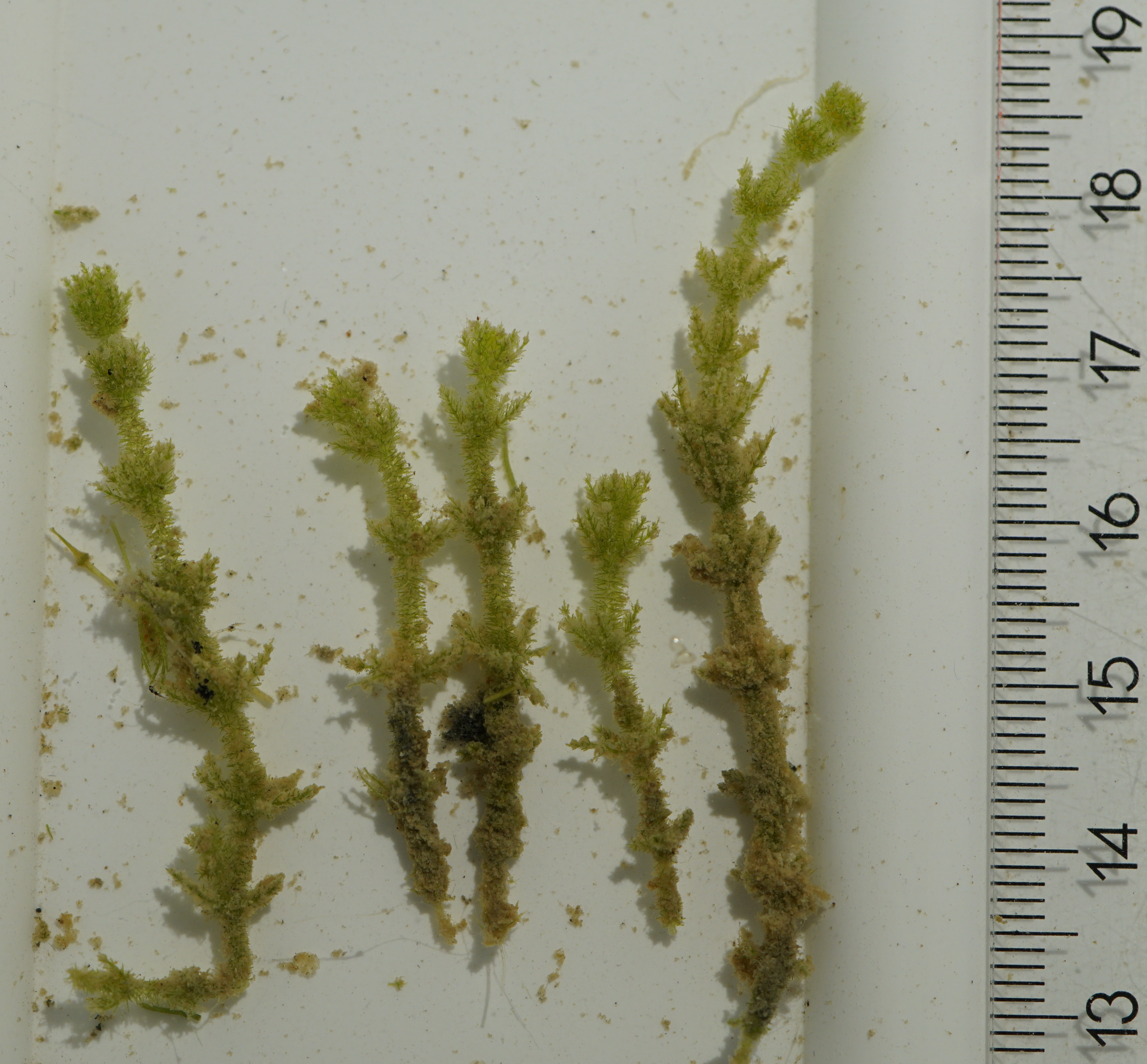

Scientific classification
- Domain: Eukaryota
- Clade: Archaeplastida
- Clade: Viridiplantae
- Division: Charophyta
- Class: Charophyceae
- Order: Charales
- Family: Characeae
- Genus: Chara
- Species: C. canescens

Binomial name
- Chara canescens Loisel.

= Chara canescens =

Species of alga

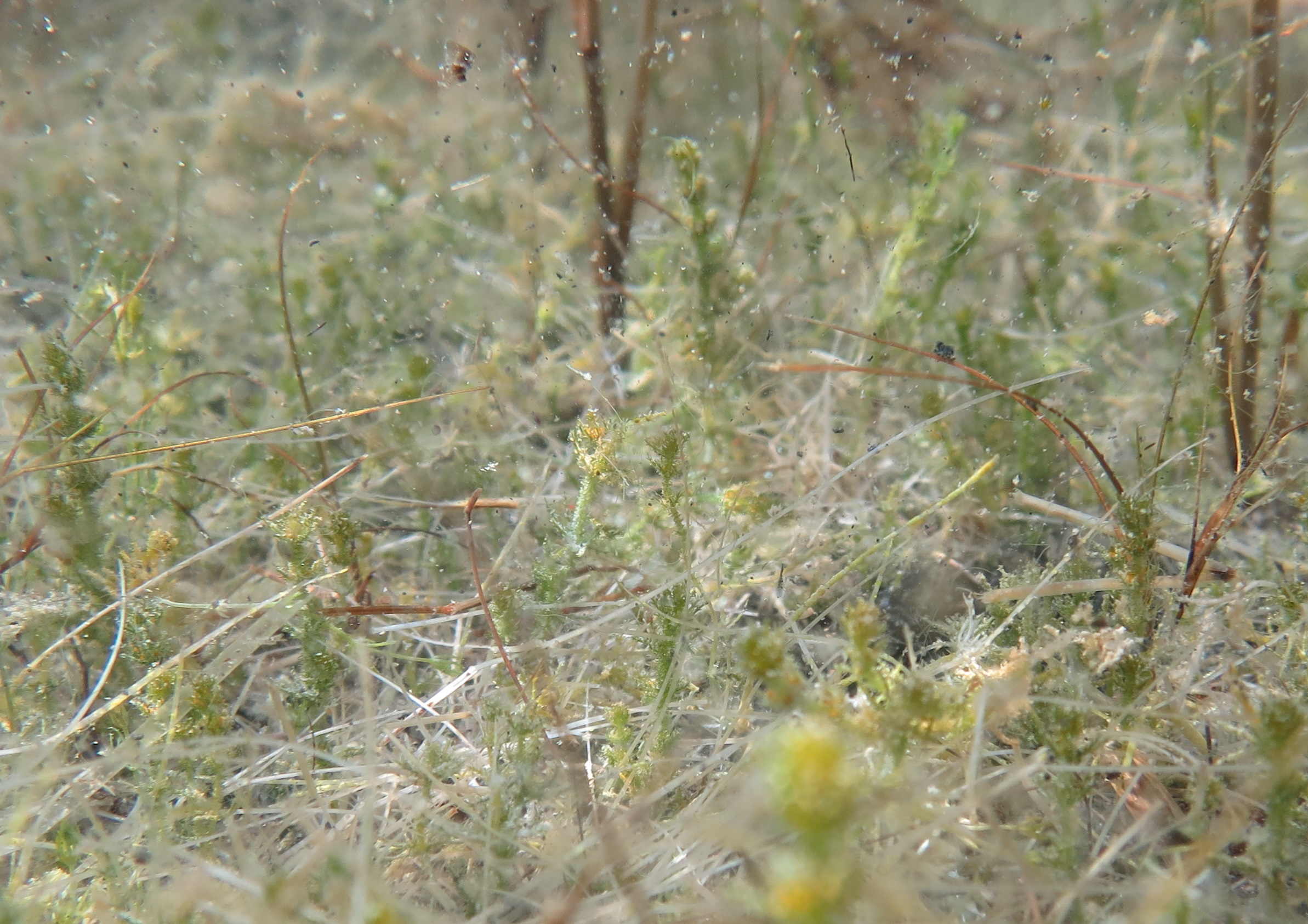
Chara canescens in lake Borken, Hesse, Germany

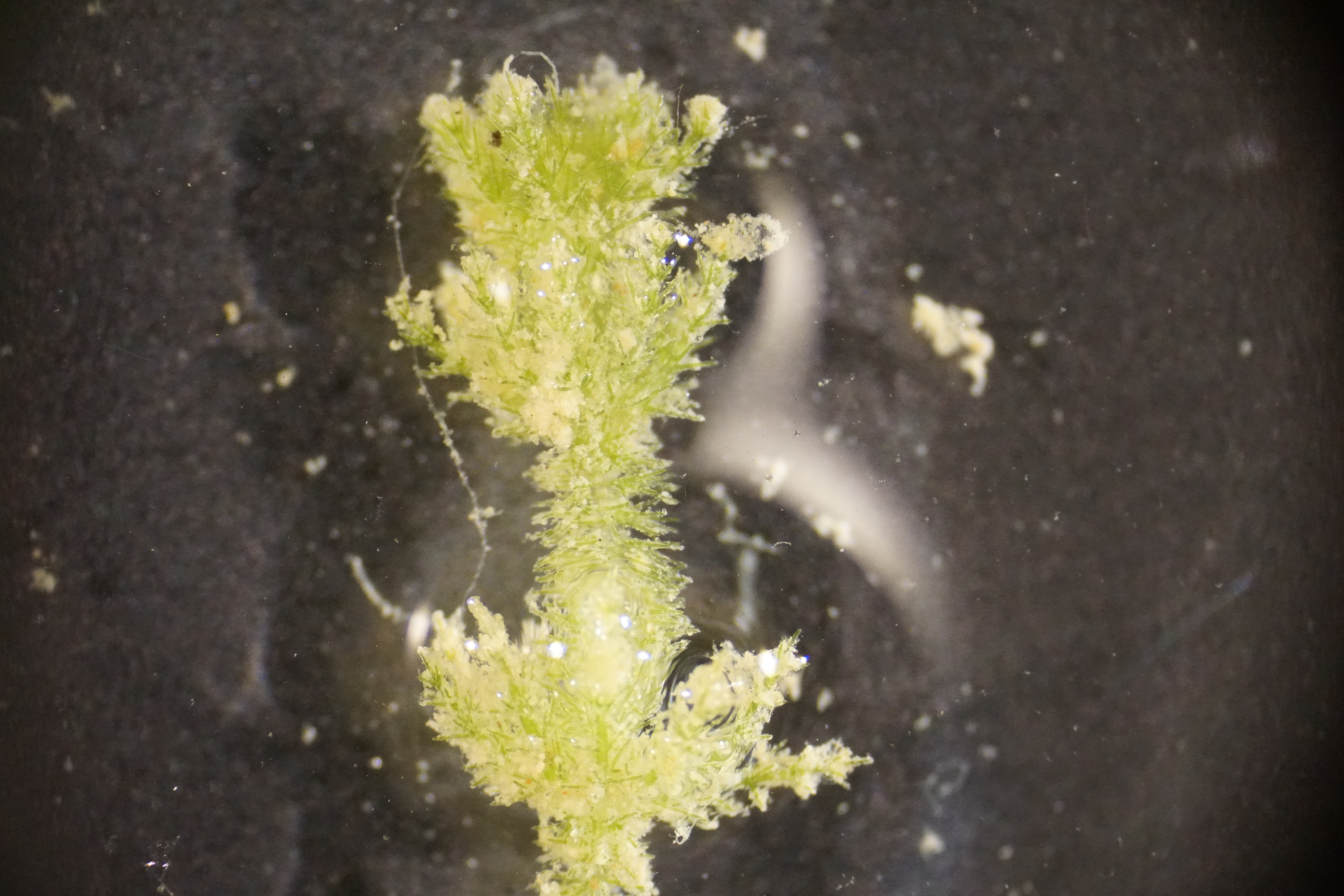
Detail view of Chara canescens

Chara canescens is a species of stonewort belonging to the family Characeae.

Its native range is Europe and Northern America. It is described as a brackish water species, but can also be found in a few inland lakes.
