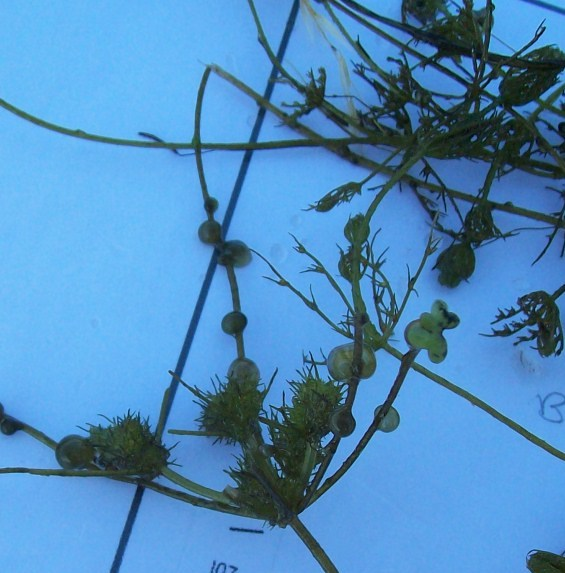
- Tolypella prolifera

Scientific classification
- Clade: Viridiplantae
- (unranked): Charophyta
- Class: Charophyceae
- Order: Charales
- Family: Characeae
- Genus: Tolypella (A.Braun) A.Braun

Species
- See text.

= Tolypella =

Species of plant

Tolypella is a genus of green algae belonging to the family Characeae.

The genus was described in 1857 by Alexander Braun.

The genus has cosmopolitan distribution.

Species:

- Tolypella antarctica (A. Braun) R. Corillion, 1982
- Tolypella apiculata A. Braun, 1882
- Tolypella boldii T. Sawa, 1973
- Tolypella californica A. Braun, 1882
- Tolypella canadensis T. Sawa, 1973
- Tolypella comosa T.F. Allen, 1883
- Tolypella fimbriata T.F. Allen, 1883
- Tolypella giennensis Reyes Prósper, 1910
- Tolypella glomerata (Desvaux) Leonhardi, 1863
- Tolypella hispanica C.F.O. Nordstedt ex T.F. Allen, 1888
- Tolypella intertexta T.F. Allen, 1883
- Tolypella intricata (Trentepohl ex Roth) H. von Leonhardi, 1863
- Tolypella longicoma A. Braun, 1882
- Tolypella nidifica (O.F. Müller) Leonhardi, 1864
- Tolypella normaniana C.F.O. Nordstedt, 1868
- Tolypella porteri (F.K. Daily) R.D. Wood, 1965
- Tolypella prolifera (Ziz ex A. Braun) Leonhardi, 1863
- Tolypella ramosa W.Q. Chen, G.X. Wang & F.S. Han, 1990
- Tolypella salina R. Corillion, 1960
- Tolypella stipitata S. Wang, 1965
- Tolypella xizangensis Y.Y. Lee, 1981
- Tolypella yunnanensis F.S. Han & W.Q. Chen, 1982
