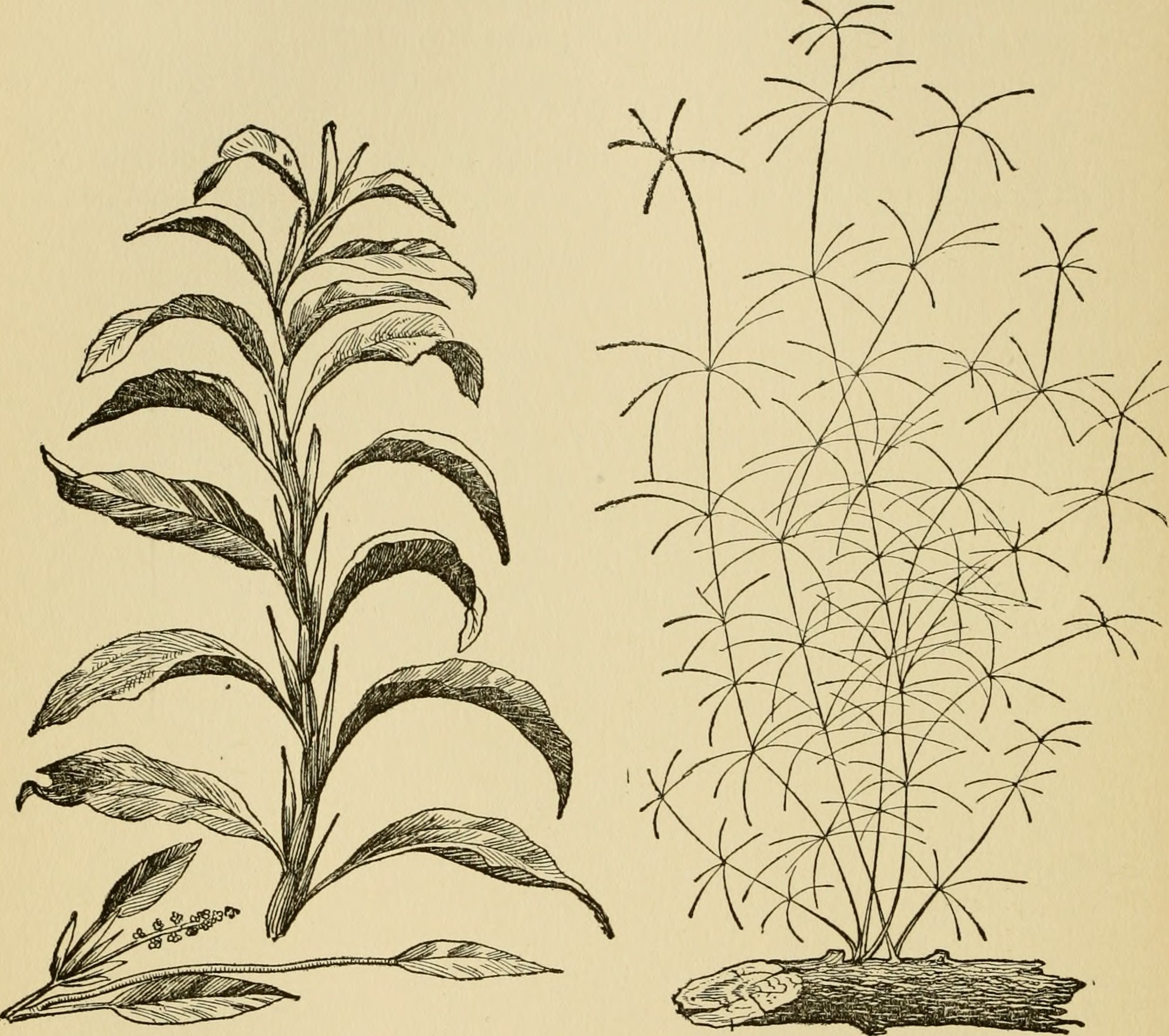

Scientific classification
- Clade: Viridiplantae
- (unranked): Charophyta
- Class: Charophyceae
- Order: Charales
- Family: Characeae
- Genus: Nitella
- Species: N. gracilis

Binomial name
- Nitella gracilis (Sm.) C.Agardh

= Nitella gracilis =

Species of alga

Nitella gracilis is a species of stonewort belonging to the family Characeae.

It has cosmopolitan distribution.
