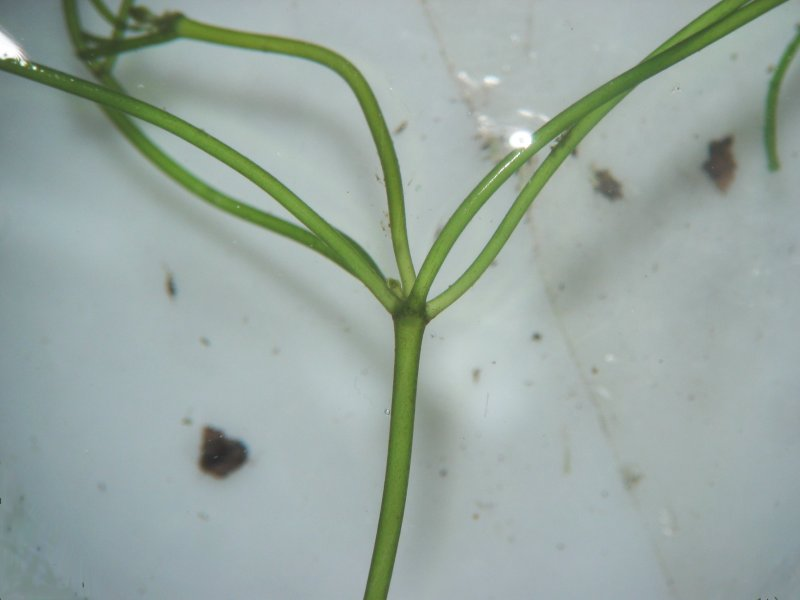
- Nitellopsis obtusa, included in some circumscriptions of the family

Scientific classification
- Domain: Eukaryota
- Clade: Archaeplastida
- Clade: Viridiplantae
- Division: Charophyta
- Class: Charophyceae
- Order: Charales
- Family: Feistiellaceae; Schudack

Genera
- See text.

= Feistiellaceae =

Family of algae

Feistiellaceae is a family of freshwater green algae in the order Charales.

== Genera ==
As of February 2022, AlgaeBase and Fossilworks accepted three genera:

- †Amblyochara Grambast – 6 species
- †Feistiella Schudack – 8 species
- Nitellopsis Hy – 24 species

With this circumscription, the family as a whole is not extinct, since Nitellopsis contains living (extant) species, including the widely dispersed Nitellopsis obtusa. Other sources place Nitellopsis in the family Characeae, leaving Feistiellaceae with only extinct genera.
