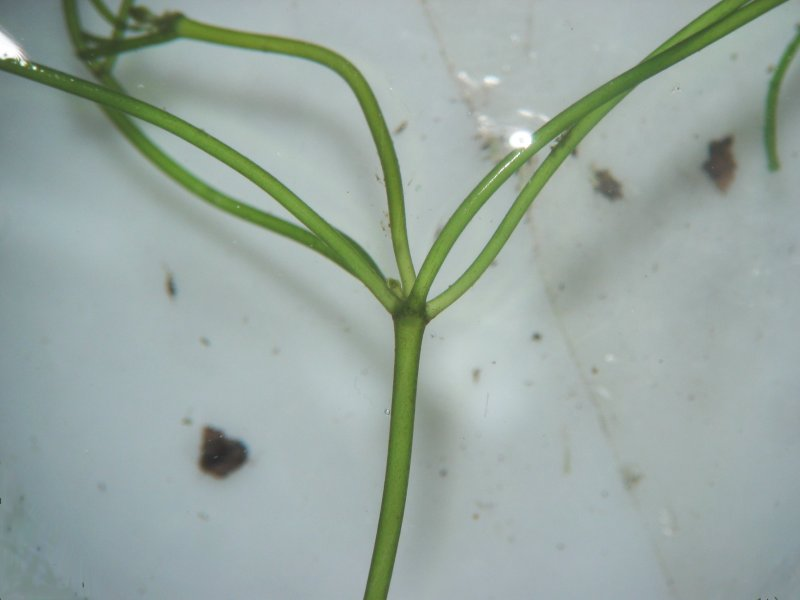
- Nitellopsis obtusa

Scientific classification
- Domain: Eukaryota
- Clade: Archaeplastida
- Clade: Viridiplantae
- Division: Charophyta
- Class: Charophyceae
- Order: Charales
- Family: Feistiellaceae (?)
- Genus: Nitellopsis; Hy

Species
- See text.

= Nitellopsis =

Genus of green algae

Nitellopsis is a genus of charophyte green algae. Some sources, including AlgaeBase, place it in the family Feistiellaceae. Others place it in the family Characeae.

== Species ==
As of February 2022, AlgaeBase listed the following species:

Extant

- Nitellopsis obtusa (Desvaux) J.Groves
- Nitellopsis sarcularis J.S. Zaneveld

Extinct

- †Nitellopsis aemula (Grambast) Grambast & Soulié-Märsche
- †Nitellopsis dutemplei (Watelet) Grambast & Soulié-Märsche
- †Nitellopsis etrusca (M.Tongiorgi) Grambast & Soulié-Märsche
- †Nitellopsis exilis Glukovskaja
- †Nitellopsis globula (Mädler) Grambast & Soulié-Märsche
- †Nitellopsis helicteres (Brongniart) Grambast & Soulié-Märsche
- †Nitellopsis helvetica (Mädler) Grambast & Soulié-Märsche
- †Nitellopsis houi (Shui Wang) Grambast & Soulié-Märsche
- †Nitellopsis huangii (Y.H.Lu) Grambast & Soulié-Märsche
- †Nitellopsis ixtapensis (E.F.K.Daily & Durham) Grambast & Soulié-Märsche
- †Nitellopsis major (Grambast) Grambast & Soulié-Märsche
- †Nitellopsis merianii (Unger) Grambast & Soulié-Märsche
- †Nitellopsis morulosa (Feist-Castel) Feist-Castel & N.Grambast
- †Nitellopsis ovalis (G.D.Yang) Feist-Castel & N.Grambast
- †Nitellopsis ovata Krassavina
- †Nitellopsis palaeohungarica (Rásky) Grambast & Soulié-Märsche
- †Nitellopsis sigalii (Grambast) Grambast & Soulié-Märsche
- †Nitellopsis supraplana (Peck & Reker) Grambast & Soulié-Märsche
- †Nitellopsis thaleri (Castel & Grambast) Grambast & Soulié-Märsche
- †Nitellopsis usboensis (Maslov) Grambast & Soulié-Märsche
- †Nitellopsis wangii (Shui Wang) Grambast & Soulié-Märsche
- †Nitellopsis wonnacottii (Grambast) Grambast & Soulié-Märsche
