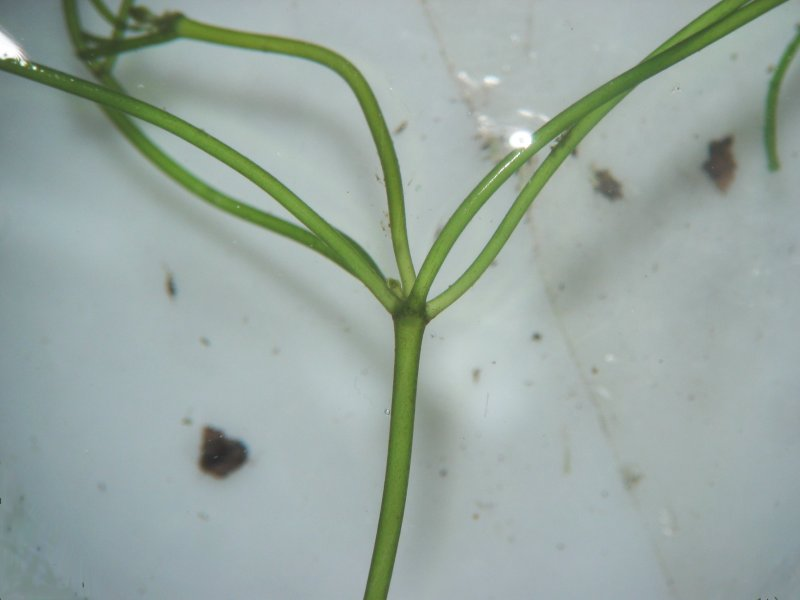

Scientific classification
- Domain: Eukaryota
- Clade: Archaeplastida
- Clade: Viridiplantae
- Class: Charophyceae
- Order: Charales
- Family: Feistiellaceae (?)
- Genus: Nitellopsis
- Species: N. obtusa

Binomial name
- Nitellopsis obtusa (N.A. Desvaux) J. Groves

= Nitellopsis obtusa =

Species of plant

Nitellopsis obtusa, known as starry stonewort, is an aquatic algae native to Europe and Asia, belonging to either the Characeae or Feistiellaceae families. It was first recognized as an invasive species following its migration to North America in 1978. N. obtusa was first discovered in North America in 1978 in New York. Since then, it has been documented in various lakes throughout the continent, extending as far north as Canada. Records indicate that N. obtusa is the sole surviving member of an evolutionary lineage of the Cretaceous-Tertiary boundary. As a native species, N. obtusa contributes to water clarity and supports aquatic food webs. The species is commonly found in low-flow lakes with alkaline-to-neutral pH and elevated conductivity. However, as it expanded into North America, populations in parts of its native range have declined. It’s extended, late-season growing may contribute to its invasive success by making it challenging for timing control efforts. Although many efforts have been made to control N. obtusa through physical and chemical removal treatments, there have been few systematic evaluations on the success of these attempts.

== Taxonomy and classification ==
N. obtusa was first classified within the genus Chara in 1810. Since then, it has been reclassified into four other genera, including Nitella, Lychnothamnus, Nitellopsis, and Tolypellopsis. Although it is currently accepted as a member of the Chareae tribe, its taxonomic placement has varied inconsistently between Chara, Lamprothamnium, and Lychnothamnus. Molecular phylogenetic analysis indicates that starry stonewort is more closely related to Lychnothamnus than to Chara or Lamprotheamnium.

== Characteristics/Reproduction ==
Starry stonewort is most recognizable by its white star-shaped bulbils, which are seed-like structures located at the nodes of rhizoid structures that anchor its grass-like body to a substrate. Identifying N. obtusa is difficult due to the long internode cells and the node whorls intertwining. Proper identification of the species involves counting the number of upwardly radiating node whorl branches, which can be unclear when the nodes are entwined. N. obtusa must be composed of 5-7 upward radiating node whorl branchlets, which contain bract cells. Due to the algae containing both fragments and bubils, they can produce both sexually and asexually. However, studies have shown that native populations primarily reproduce asexually. Sexual reproduction becomes more prevalent during shorter growing seasons and in shallower water. According to a 2017 study, only male individuals of N. obtusa have been identified in North America. With no female individuals, the species relies on vegetative bulbil reproduction and fragmentation. This alga can survive at depths up to three times deeper than the Secchi disk transparency, requiring very little light. It’s also known for drastically improving water clarity by releasing substances that slow or stop the growth of phytoplankton and other algae. It has been reported that elevated temperatures can lead to the complete collapse of starry stonewort meadows. After dense stands of starry stonewort decline in shallow areas, the species often persists as less concentrated but still actively growing meadows in cooler zones. These remaining populations tend to follow a distinct temperature- and light-driven zonation pattern, extending into deeper parts of the littoral region before sharply dropping off at the outer edge of the slope. Water temperature has been shown to play an important role in the growth and reproductive development of N. obtusa, with studies indicating that gametangia formation is more likely to occur during warm, sunny growing seasons.

== Habitat ==
Starry stonewort is native to Eurasia, where it has declined across much of its native range even as it rapidly expands throughout North America. Once considered a highly beneficial plant in Europe and Asia, it now occupies a variety of freshwater habitats across both regions. The species typically inhabits deep, slow moving waters with sparse vegetation and can maintain permanent populations in freshwater with salinity levels up to 5%, while tolerating fluctuations of up to 17% for short periods. Nitellopsis obtusa is strongly associated with neutral to alkaline waters, elevated conductivity, and calcareous, nutrient‑rich sediments that support its growth and the formation of dense benthic mats. Starry stonewort can grow on both organic and inorganic substratesand is commonly found at depths ranging from 1 m to more than 6 m in lakes and slow moving rivers, though the article documents occurrences from 0.5 to over 14 meters depending on water clarity and light availability. It is most abundant in mesotrophic to eutrophic, low flow or still waters where its tall, filamentous structure can dominate the substrate. Starry stonewort is sensitive to disturbances such as drought and eutrophication, which can reduce its abundance and restrict it to deeper, continuously inundated areas. These environmental characteristics help explain both its decline in parts of its native range and its patchy but expanding distribution across North America.

== Ecology ==
Starry stonewort can significantly reshape freshwater ecosystems by forming large, dense, nearly monotypic mats that displace native macrophytes and algae, often limiting their access to light and space. Since it grows taller than most native Characeae, it can fill much of the water column in shallow areas, further intensifying shading effects on native species. As a characean, starry stonewort may also alter water chemistry and nutrient cycling through high productivity and nutrient uptake, potentially restricting the availability of nutrients to native plants. Early research has documented declines in native plant richness and biomass in lakes where starry stonewort abundance increases, suggesting measurable impacts on community composition. Although its effects on fish and other aquatic animals remain uncertain, excessive vegetation cover created by dense mats may degrade habitat quality in some cases. Overall, the article emphasizes that while concern is warranted, ecological impacts in North America remain poorly quantified and require further study. While originally being native to Europe and Asia, starry stonewort has taken root in significant quantities in the Great Lakes areas of the United States/Canadian border, as well as surrounding bodies of water. Starry stonewort is able to effectively colonize and thrive in many different conditions in shallow water, however the main factor tends to be dependent on water transparency.

== Invasiveness ==
Starry stonewort exhibits several traits that make it a highly invasive species in North America. Although it is of conservation concern in much of its native Eurasian range, it has expanded rapidly since its first North American records in the 1970s, spreading from large water bodies such as the St. Lawrence River and Lake St. Clair into numerous inland lakes across the Great Lakes region. Its invasiveness is driven in part by its ability to form large, dense, nearly monotypic mats that can displace native macrophytes, limit light availability, and alter habitat structure. The species also reproduces exclusively asexually in North America. This occurs through fragments and bulbils, which enable rapid clonal expansion and complicate eradication. Human-mediated dispersal, particularly via boats and equipment, further accelerates its spread between water bodies. Although ecological impacts remain understudied, early evidence shows declines in native plant richness and biomass where starry stonewort becomes abundant, suggesting strong competitive effects. Combined with its broad environmental tolerance and resistance to many management efforts, these traits underscore the species’ high invasive potential and the challenges it poses for freshwater ecosystems.

== Environmental effects ==
Starry stonewort forms thick layers of biomass, called “pillows”, in the habitats where it is able to take over. These pillows act as a benthic barrier, and emit phytotoxins which inhibit phytoplankton and other algae, killing them off. This causes the water to become clearer, but also inhibits the photosynthetic processes that are incredibly beneficial to their relevant habitats On top of reducing biomass of most other aquatic plants, many species of fish are unable to spawn within these conditions. Clams and other invertebrates are also displaced due to heavy presence of starry stonewort. Bass and sunfish, which are known for their ability to spawn in dense layers of native Chara algae, were not able to spawn within the pillows of Nitellopsis Obtusa.

== Management efforts ==
Several management efforts, such as hand pulling or diver assisted suction harvesting (DASH) have been employed against starry stonewort; however copper-based algaecides (such as copper sulfate) are typically used in controlling the algal population. Copper-based algaecides have shown great efficacy in short term control against smaller, filamentous algae; however, there is very little published data about the use of said algaecides against macroalgae. In attempts to stop the spread of the algae, it is recommended people use the Clean, Drain, Dry method. It is recommended that people clean their watercraft of any plant life and/or mud debris, drain all water that may be present in gear or watercraft, and dry any gear and watercraft for 21 days before placing them in a different body of water.
