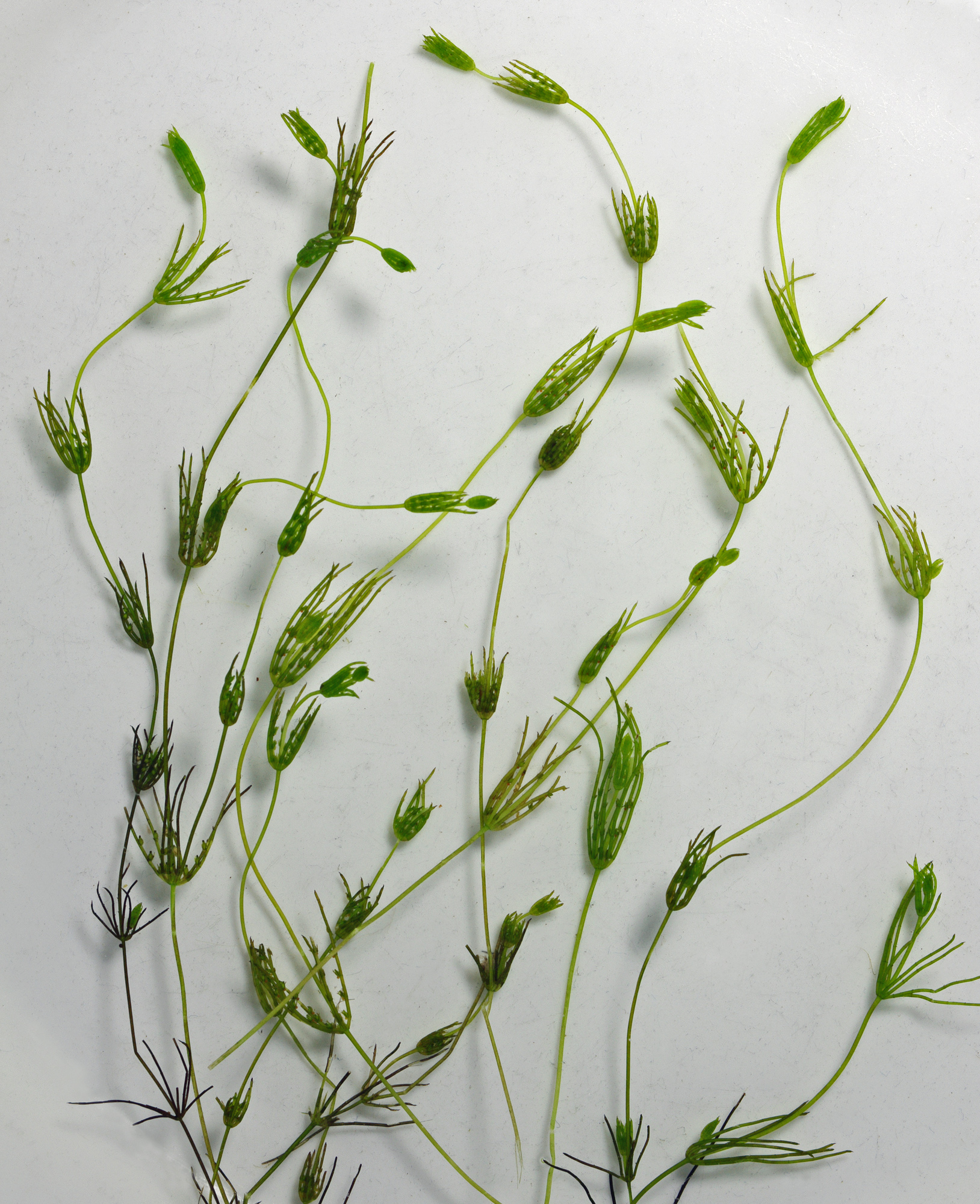

Scientific classification
- Domain: Eukaryota
- Clade: Archaeplastida
- Clade: Viridiplantae
- Division: Charophyta
- Class: Charophyceae
- Order: Charales
- Family: Characeae
- Genus: Chara
- Species: C. globularis

Binomial name
- Chara globularis Thuill.

= Chara globularis =

Species of alga

Chara globularis is a species of charophyte green algae in the family Characeae. Native to Europe, but widespread among the world, it inhabits fresh and brackish-water environments. The Chara globularis originally documented was identified as the short-end segment(SH) type, with a black fossa wall containing a granulate, papillate, or fine pusticular pattern. An elongate-end(EL) type was previously thought to belong to this same species, but upon re-examination was determined to be phylogenetically separate from the Chara globularis, indicating that it was a different species and, thus, being reclassified as the Chara leptospira.
