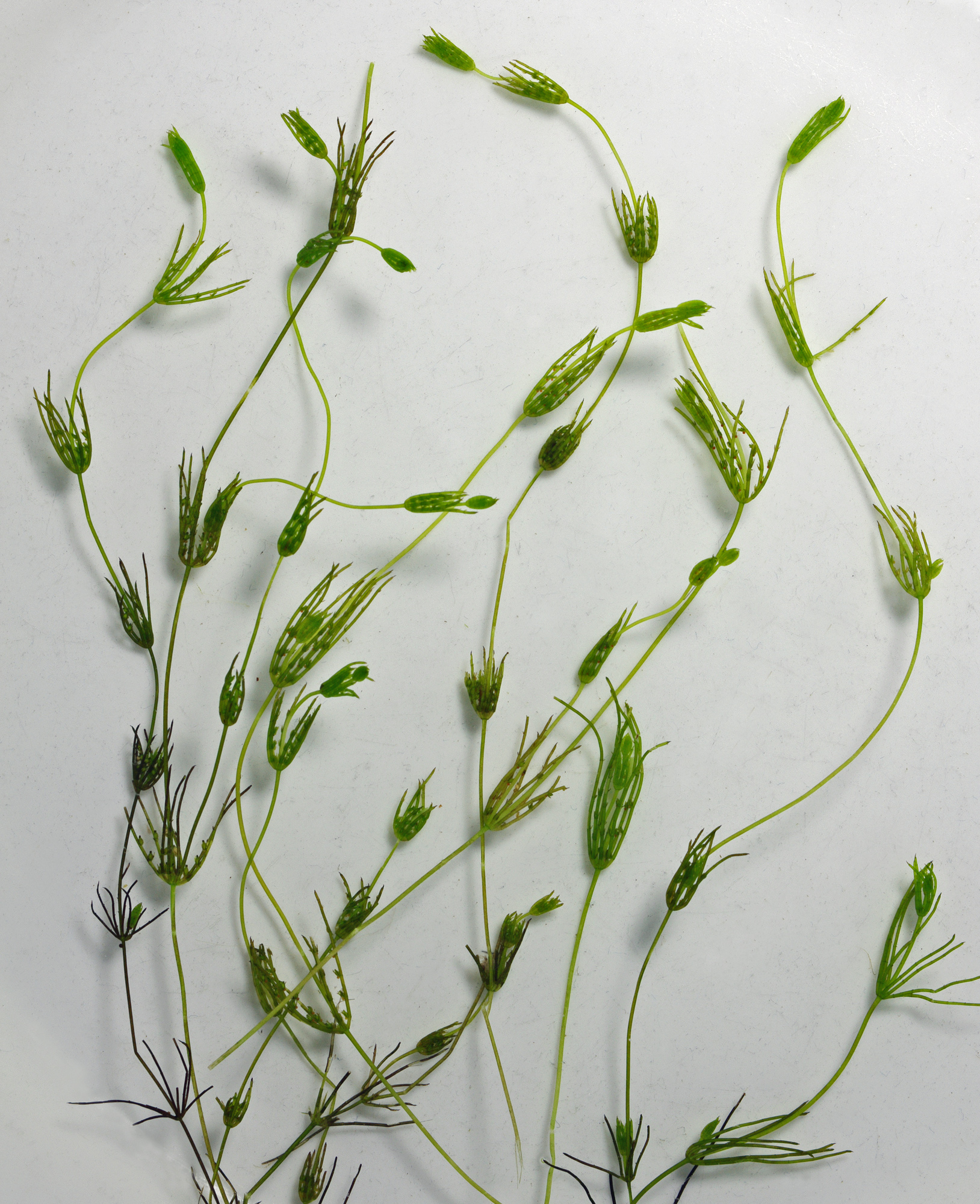
- Chara globularis

Scientific classification
- Domain: Eukaryota
- Clade: Archaeplastida
- Clade: Viridiplantae
- Division: Charophyta
- Class: Charophyceae
- Order: Charales
- Family: Characeae; S.F.Gray

Genera
- See text.

= Characeae =

Family of freshwater green algae

Characeae is a family of freshwater green algae in the order Charales, commonly known as stoneworts. They are also known as brittleworts or skunkweed, from the fragility of their lime-encrusted stems, and from the foul odor these produce when stepped on.

In some treatments, the Characeae includes all the living (extant) species of Charales; this circumscription is followed here. In other treatments, the genus Nitellopsis, which has both extant and extinct species, is placed in a separate family, Feistiellaceae.

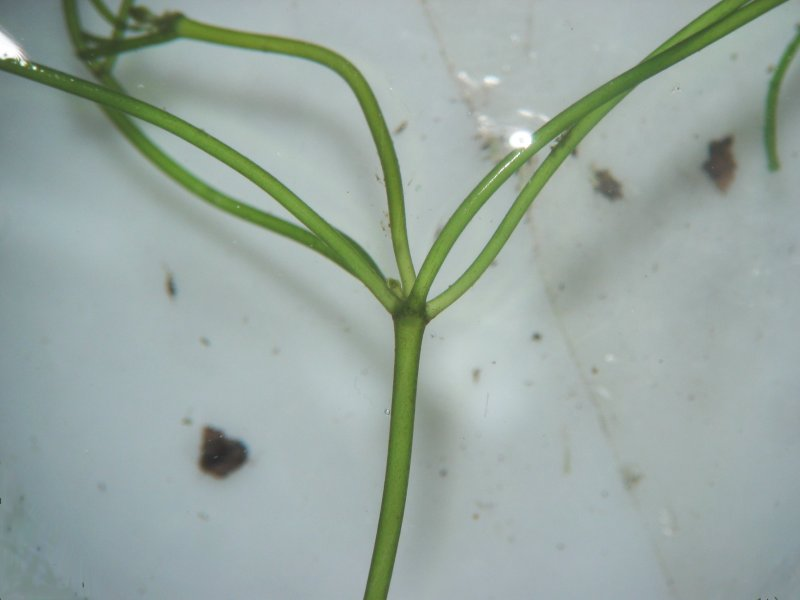
Nitellopsis obtusa

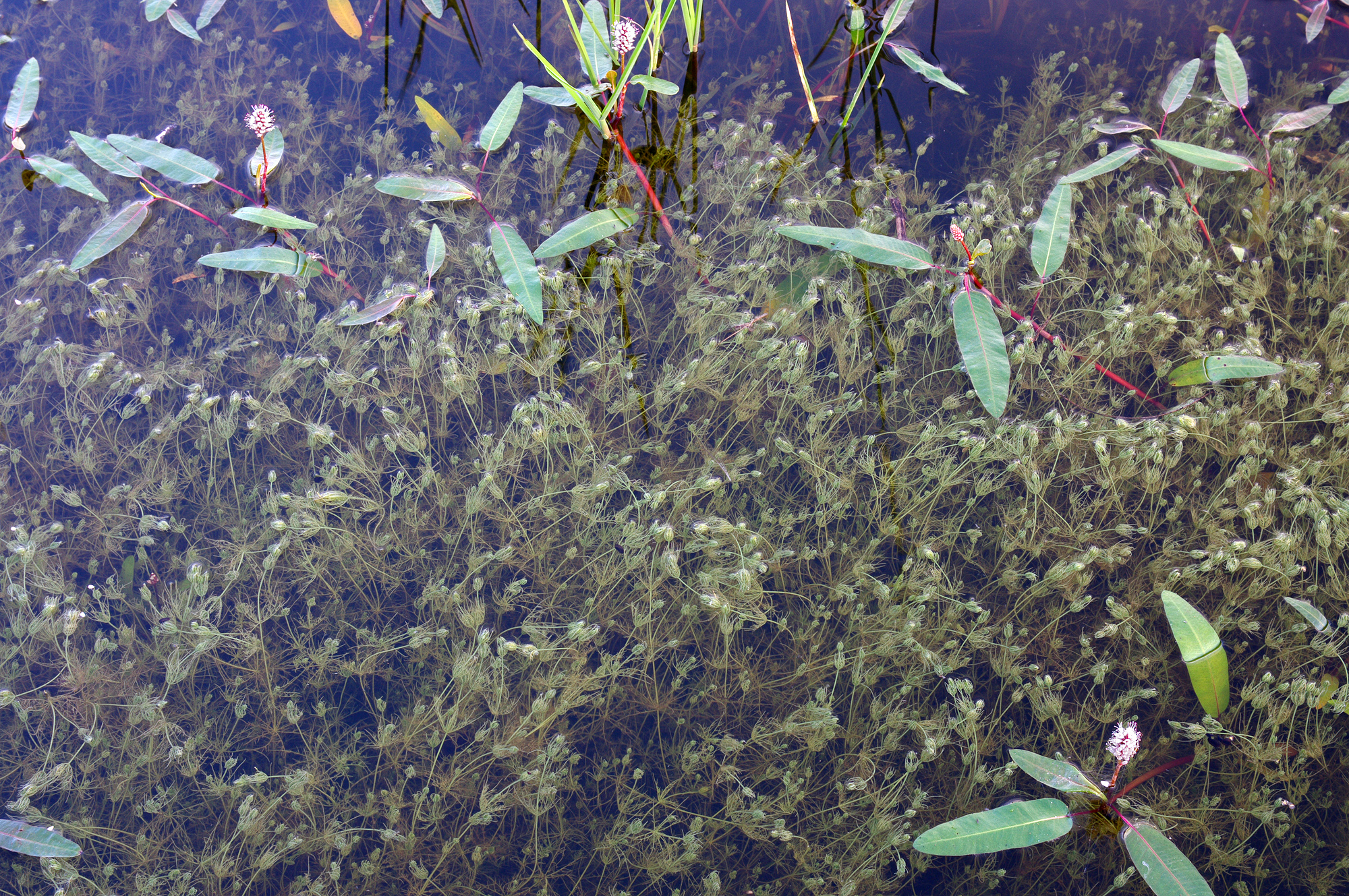
Submerged meadow of Chara vulgaris

== Description ==
Living members of the Characeae sensu lato grow in freshwater and brackish environments worldwide, and have large, macroscopic thalli growing up to 120 cm long, they are branched, multicellular, and use chlorophyll to photosynthesize. Their only diploid stage in the life cycle is the unicellular oospore. They may be called stoneworts, because the plants can become encrusted in lime (calcium carbonate) after some time. The "stem" is actually a central stalk consisting of giant, multinucleated cells. They are unique in having a whorl of small branchlets at each node in the stipe which gives them a superficial resemblance to the genus Equisetum. In these whorls it is possible to see the phenomenon of cytoplasmic streaming. Streaming in Chara is the fastest recorded of any cell. Cytoplasmic streaming is caused by the microfilaments found inside the cell, as proven by the use of cytochalasin B to stop streaming.

There are about 400 extant species worldwide, with 33 in Britain and Ireland according to Groves and Bullock-Webster), however Stewart and Church (1992) reduce this to 21.

Characeae are the principal photosynthesizers of some of the volcanic crater lakes of Nicaragua, and can be found in excess of 20 meters depth in some circumstances. Introduced tilapia (Oreochromis niloticus) consumed all the Characeae in Lake Apoyo.

The antheridia (or globules) and oogonia (or nucules) are protected by a layer of sterile cells when mature; the oogonium is oblong in shape and consists of a single egg, while the spherical antheridium is packed with threadlike cells that produce spermatia. As a result, the Characeae have the most complex structure of all green algae.

== Genera ==
Genera that include extant species and are placed in a broad circumscription of the family are:

- Chara L.
- Lamprothamnium J.Groves
- Lychnothamnus (F.J.Ruprecht) A.Braun
- Nitella C.A.Agardh
- Nitellopsis Hy (placed in Feistiellaceae by some sources)
- Tolypella (A.Braun) A.Braun

== Ecology ==
Most extant Characeae are found in fresh water, usually in still, clear water where they attach to the substrate by rhizoids. They can be pioneer colonizers or ephemerals. They are usually found in low to medium nutrient-rich water and tend to disappear due to eutrophication. Some stoneworts can survive in brackish or maritime habitats and occur in ephemeral saline lakes in Australia that have twice the salinity of seawater.
