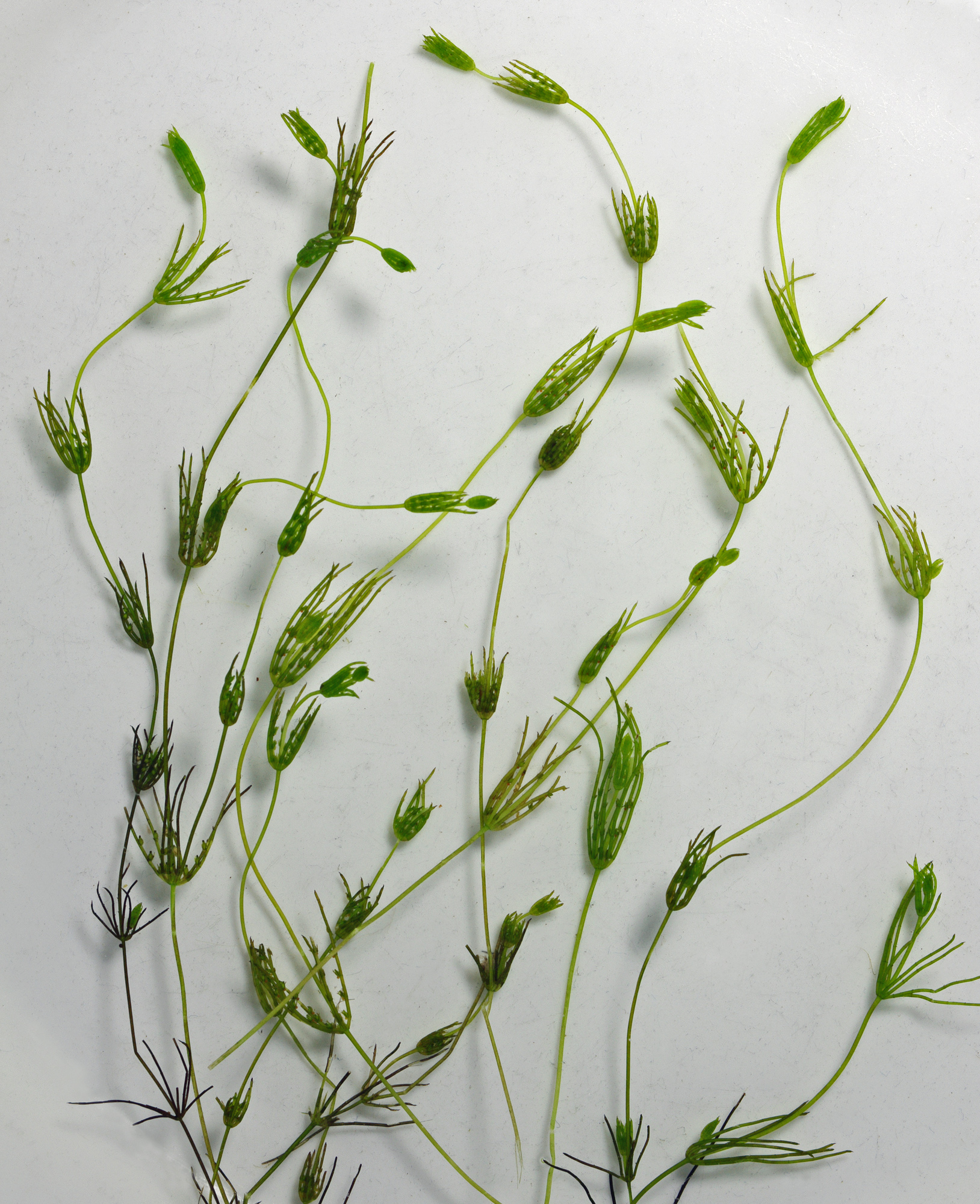
- Chara globularis

Scientific classification
- Domain: Eukaryota
- Clade: Archaeplastida
- Clade: Viridiplantae
- Division: Charophyta
- Class: Charophyceae
- Order: Charales

Families
- See text

= Charales =

Stoneworts

Order of green algae in the division Charophyta

Charales is an order of freshwater green algae in the division Charophyta, class Charophyceae, commonly known as stoneworts. Depending on the treatment of the genus Nitellopsis, living (extant) species are placed into either one family (Characeae) or two (Characeae and Feistiellaceae). Further families are used for fossil members of the order. Linnaeus established the genus Chara in 1753.

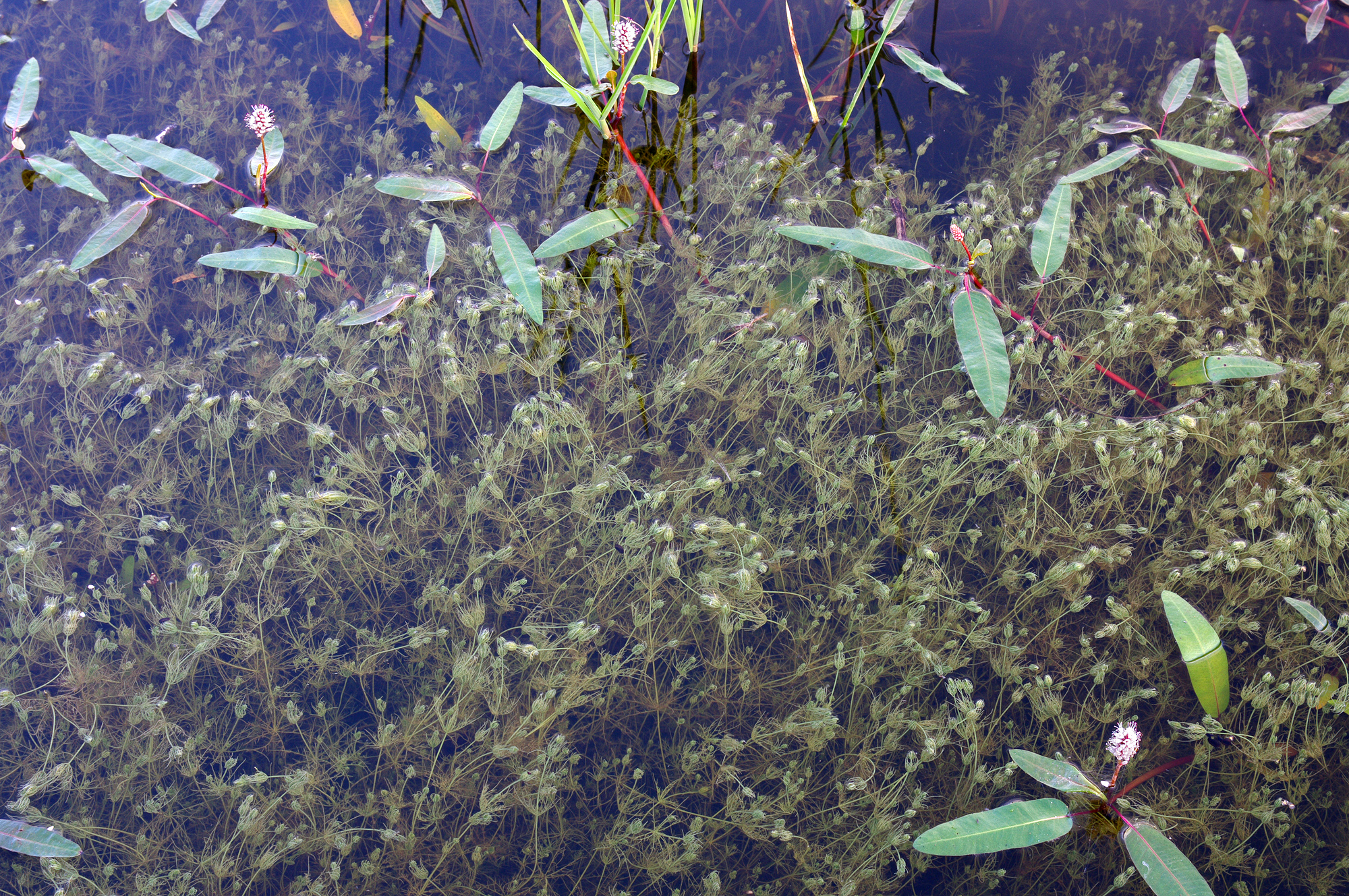
Submerged meadow of Chara vulgaris

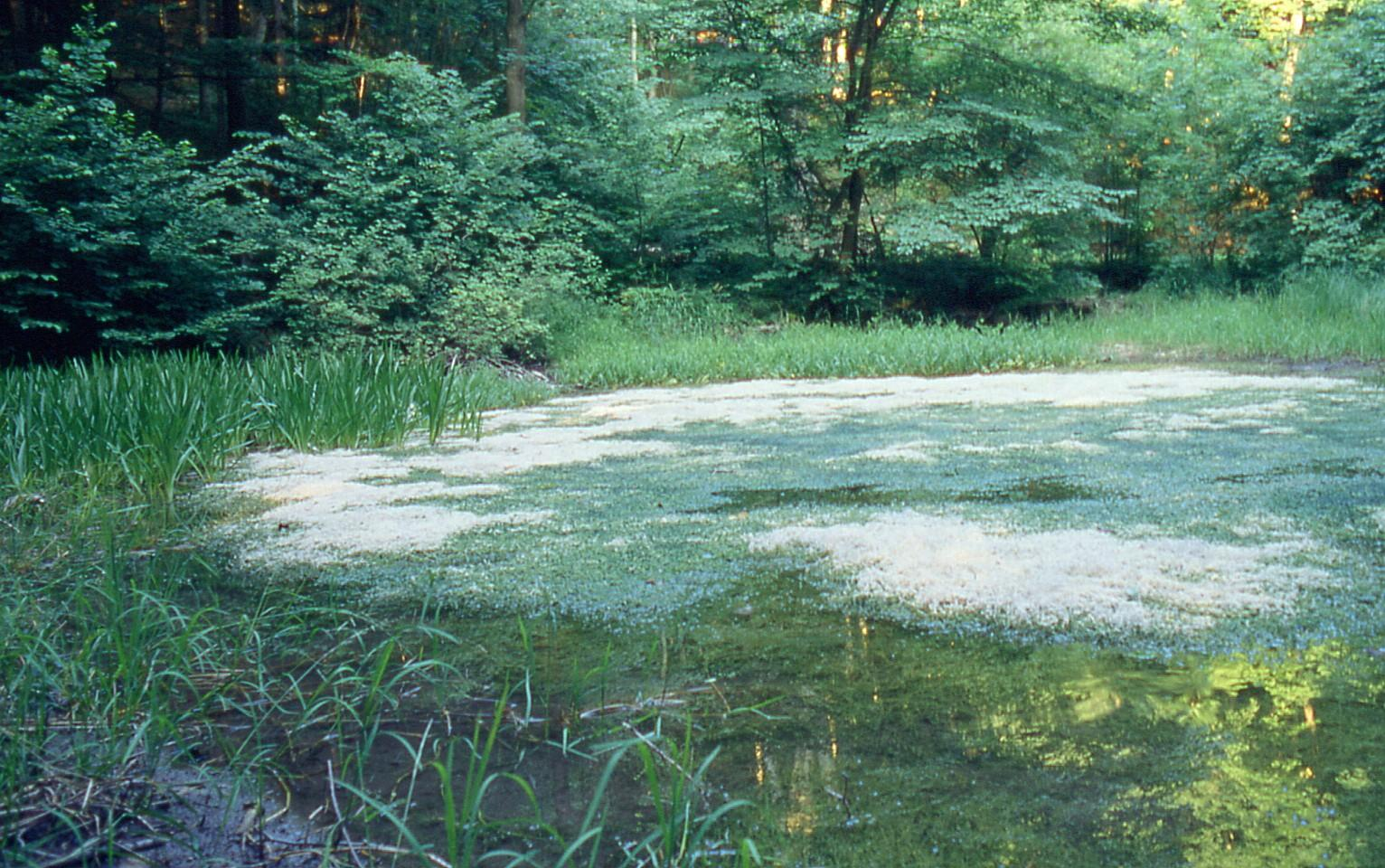
Lime crust on Chara sp. in a spring pond in Germany

== Taxonomy ==
The higher level classification of green algae was unsettled as of February 2022. AlgaeBase places Charales within the class Charophyceae and its circumscription of the division Charophyta.

=== Families ===
The number of families and their division into genera varies. As of February 2022, AlgaeBase accepts two families containing some extant species and four families containing only fossil species:

- Characeae S.F.Gray
- Feistiellaceae Schudack
- †Aclistocharaceae X.G.Zhou (may be included in Characeae)
- †Atopocharaceae R.E.Peck (may be included in Clavatoraceae)
- †Clavatoraceae Pia
- †Porocharaceae Grambast

AlgaeBase places the genus Nitellopsis, which has both extant and extinct species, in the family Feistiellaceae. Other sources place Nitellopsis in the family Characeae, with Feistiellaceae containing only fossil species, so that all extant species are in the family Characeae. The Interim Register of Marine and Nonmarine Genera accepts a further three extinct families:

- †Eocharaceae Grambast
- †Palaeocharaceae Pia
- †Raskyellaceae Grambast

== Fossil record ==
Body fossils of representatives of the order Charales do exist, but are rare. The fossil record of the Charales consists mostly of gyrogonites, that is, calcified fructifications or, more exactly, calcified spiral cells surrounding the oospores. It may be noted that the gyrogonites are studied by palaeontologists, but not often destroyed (using acids) during neontological research to liberate the oospores.

The oldest known representative of the Charales is Eochara wickendenii Choquette from the Middle Devonian. The family Characeae starts dominating the fossil assemblages in the Paleogene or perhaps already in the Late Cretaceous.
