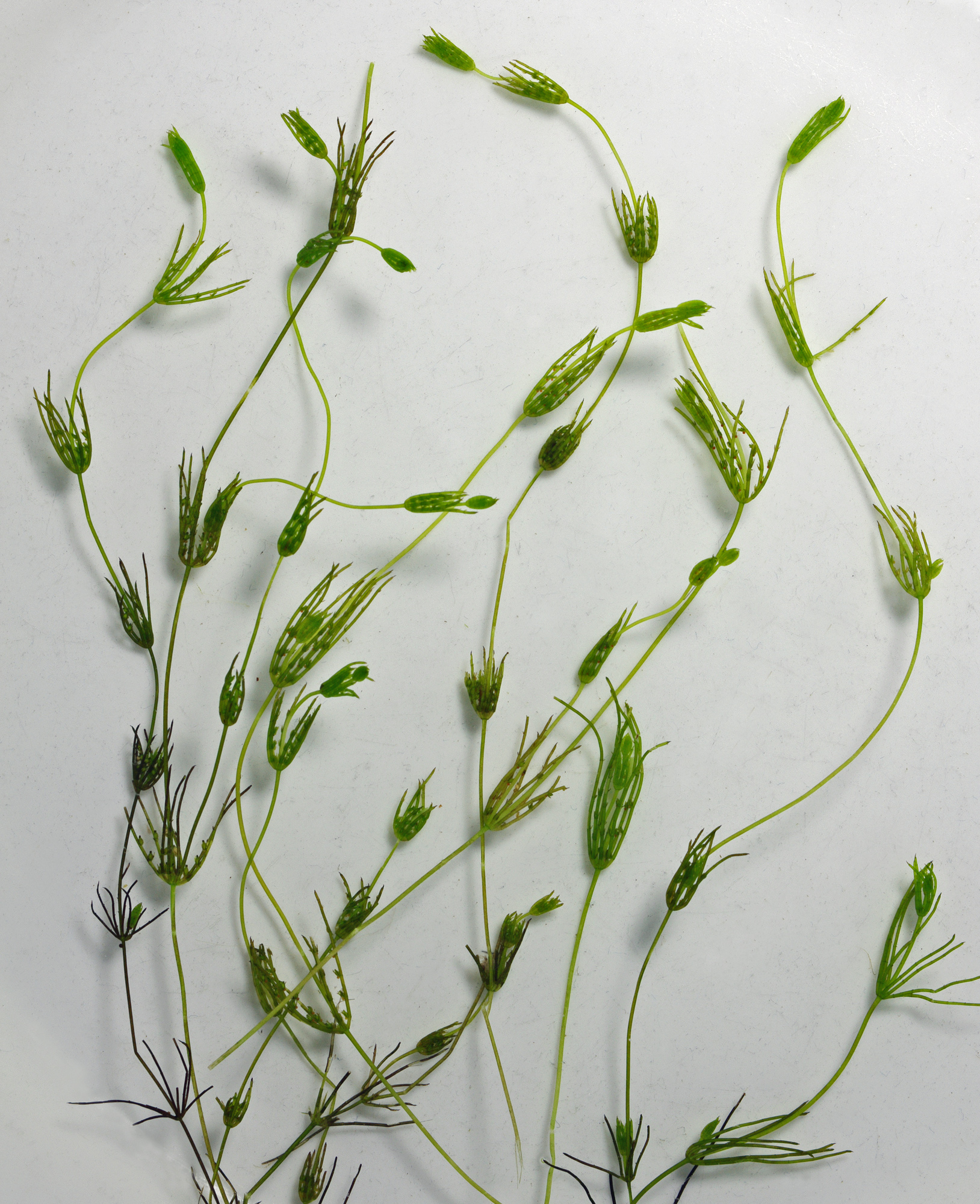
- Chara globularis

Scientific classification
- Domain: Eukaryota
- Clade: Archaeplastida
- Clade: Viridiplantae
- Clade: Streptophyta
- Division: Charophyta; Migula 1897 sensu Leliaert et al. 2012

Groups included
- Mesostigmatophyceae; Chlorokybophyceae; Streptofilum; Klebsormidiophyceae; Charophyceae; Coleochaetophyceae; Zygnematophyceae

Cladistically included but traditionally excluded taxa
- Embryophyta

= Charophyta =

Phylum of algae

Charophyta (UK: /kəˈrɒfɪtə, ˌkærəˈfaɪtə/) is a paraphyletic group of freshwater green algae, called charophytes (/ˈkærəˌfaɪts/), sometimes treated as a division, yet also as a superdivision. The terrestrial plants, the Embryophyta emerged deep within Charophyta, possibly from terrestrial unicellular charophytes, with the class Zygnematophyceae as a sister group.

With the Embryophyta now cladistically placed in the Charophyta, it is a synonym of Streptophyta. The sister group of the charophytes are the Chlorophyta. In some charophyte groups, such as the Zygnematophyceae or conjugating green algae, flagella are absent and sexual reproduction does not involve free-swimming flagellate sperm. Flagellate sperm, however, are found in stoneworts (Charales) and Coleochaetales, orders of parenchymatous charophytes that are the closest relatives of the land plants, where flagellate sperm are also present in all except the conifers and flowering plants. Fossil stoneworts of early Devonian age that are similar to those of the present day have been described from the Rhynie chert of Scotland. Somewhat different charophytes have also been collected from the Late Devonian (Famennian) Waterloo Farm lagerstätte of South Africa. These include two species each of Octochara and Hexachara, which are the oldest fossils of Charophyte axes bearing in situ oogonia.

The name comes from the genus Chara, but the finding that the Embryophyta actually emerged in them has not resulted in a much more restricted meaning of the Charophyta, namely to a much smaller side branch. This more restricted group corresponds to the Charophyceae.

== Description ==
The Zygnematophyceae, formerly known as the Conjugatophyceae, generally possess two fairly elaborate chloroplasts in each cell, rather than many discoid ones. They reproduce asexually by the development of a septum between the two cell-halves or semi-cells (in unicellular forms, each daughter-cell develops the other semi-cell afresh) and sexually by conjugation, or the fusion of the entire cell-contents of the two conjugating cells. The saccoderm desmids and the placoderm or true desmids, unicellular or filamentous members of the Zygnematophyceae, are dominant in non-calcareous, acid waters of oligotrophic or primitive lakes (e.g. Wastwater), or in lochans, tarns and bogs, as in the West of Scotland, Eire, parts of Wales and of the Lake District.

Klebsormidium, the type of the Klebsormidiophyceae, is a simple filamentous form with circular, plate-like chloroplasts, reproducing by fragmentation, by dorsiventral, biciliate swarmers and, according to Wille, a twentieth-century algologist, by aplanospores. Sexual reproduction is simple and isogamous (the male and female gametes are outwardly indistinguishable).

The Charales (Charophyceae), or stoneworts, are freshwater and brackish algae with slender green or grey stems; the grey colour of many species results from the deposition of lime on the walls, masking the green colour of the chlorophyll. The main stems are slender and branch occasionally. Lateral branchlets occur in whorls at regular intervals up the stem, they are attached by rhizoids to the substrate. The reproductive organs consist of antheridia and oogonia, though the structures of these organs differ considerably from the corresponding organs in other algae. As a result of fertilization, a protonema is formed, from which the sexually reproducing algae develops.

A new terrestrial genus found in sandy soil in the Czech Republic, Streptofilum, may belong in its own group due its unique phylogenetic position. A cell wall is absent, instead the cell membrane consists of many layers of specific scales. It is a short, filamentous and unbranched algae surrounded by a mucilaginous sheath, which often disintegrates to diads and unicells.

Representation of a charophyte: 1. Mucilage; 2. Cell wall (cellulose); 3. Vacuole; 4. Golgi apparatus, packages proteins; 5. Mitochondrion, creates ATP (energy) for the cell (flat cristae); 6. Nucleus; 7. Nucleolus; 8. Endoplasmic reticulum, the transport network for molecules going to specific parts of the cell; 9. Vesicles; 10. Dense vesicle; 11. Plastid membranes (two, primary); 12. Pyrenoid; center of carbon fixation; 13. Isthmus; 14. Polar lobe; 15. Lateral lobe; 16. First order; 17. Second order; 18. Third order

=== Reproduction ===
The cells in Charophyta algae are all haploid, except during sexual reproduction, where a diploid unicellular zygote is produced. The zygote becomes four new haploid cells through meiosis, which will develop into new algae. In multicellular forms these haploid cells will grow into a gametophyte. In embryophytes (land plants) the zygote will instead give rise to a multicellular sporophyte.

Except from land plants, retention of the zygote is only known from some species in one group of green algae; the coleochaetes. In these species the zygote is corticated by a layer of sterile gametophytic cells. Another similarity is the presence of sporopollenin in the inner wall of the zygote. In at least one species, it receives nourishment from the gametophyte through placental transfer cells.

== Classification ==
Charophyta are complex green algae that form a sister group to the Chlorophyta and within which the Embryophyta emerged. The chlorophyte and charophyte green algae and the embryophytes or land plants form a clade called the green plants or Viridiplantae, that is united among other things by the absence of phycobilins, the presence of chlorophyll a and chlorophyll b, cellulose in the cell wall and the use of starch, stored in the plastids, as a storage polysaccharide. The charophytes and embryophytes share several traits that distinguish them from the chlorophytes, such as the presence of certain enzymes (class I aldolase, Cu/Zn superoxide dismutase, glycolate oxidase, flagellar peroxidase), lateral flagella (when present), and, in many species, the use of phragmoplasts in mitosis. Thus Charophyta and Embryophyta together form the clade Streptophyta, excluding the Chlorophyta.

Charophytes such as Palaeonitella cranii and possibly the yet unassigned Parka decipiens are present in the fossil record of the Devonian. Palaeonitella differed little from some present-day stoneworts.

=== Cladogram ===
There is an emerging consensus on green algal relationships, mainly based on molecular data. The Mesostigmatophyceae (including Spirotaenia, and Chlorokybophyceae) are at the base of charophytes (streptophytes). The cladograms below show consensus phylogenetic relationships based on plastid genomes and a new proposal for a third phylum of green plants based on analysis of nuclear genomes.

Consensus plastid phylogeny

- Viridiplantae
  - Chlorophyta
  - - Streptophyta (Charophyta s.l.)
      - Mesostigmatophyceae s.l.
      - - Klebsormidiophyceae
        - - Charophyceae
          - - Coleochaetophyceae
            - - Zygnematophyceae
              - Embryophytes
                (land plants)

Consensus relationships among major green algal lineages inferred in recent plastid phylogenomic studies

Prasinodermophyta hypothesis

- Viridiplantae/ green algae
  - - Prasinodermophyta
      - Palmophyllophyceae
      - Prasinodermophyceae
  - - Chlorophyta
    - - Streptophyta (Charophyta s.l.)
        - Mesostigmatophyceae s.l.
        - - Klebsormidiophyceae
          - - Charophyceae
            - - Coleochaetophyceae
              - - Zygnematophyceae
                - Embryophytes
                  (land plants)

Relationships among major green algal lineages based on a recent nuclear phylogenomic study

Mesostigmatophyceae s.l. in the cladograms corresponds to a clade of a narrower circumscription, Mesostigmatophyceae s.s., and a separate class Chlorokybophyceae, as used by AlgaeBase.

The Mesostigmatophyceae are not filamentous, but the other basal charophytes (streptophytes) are.
