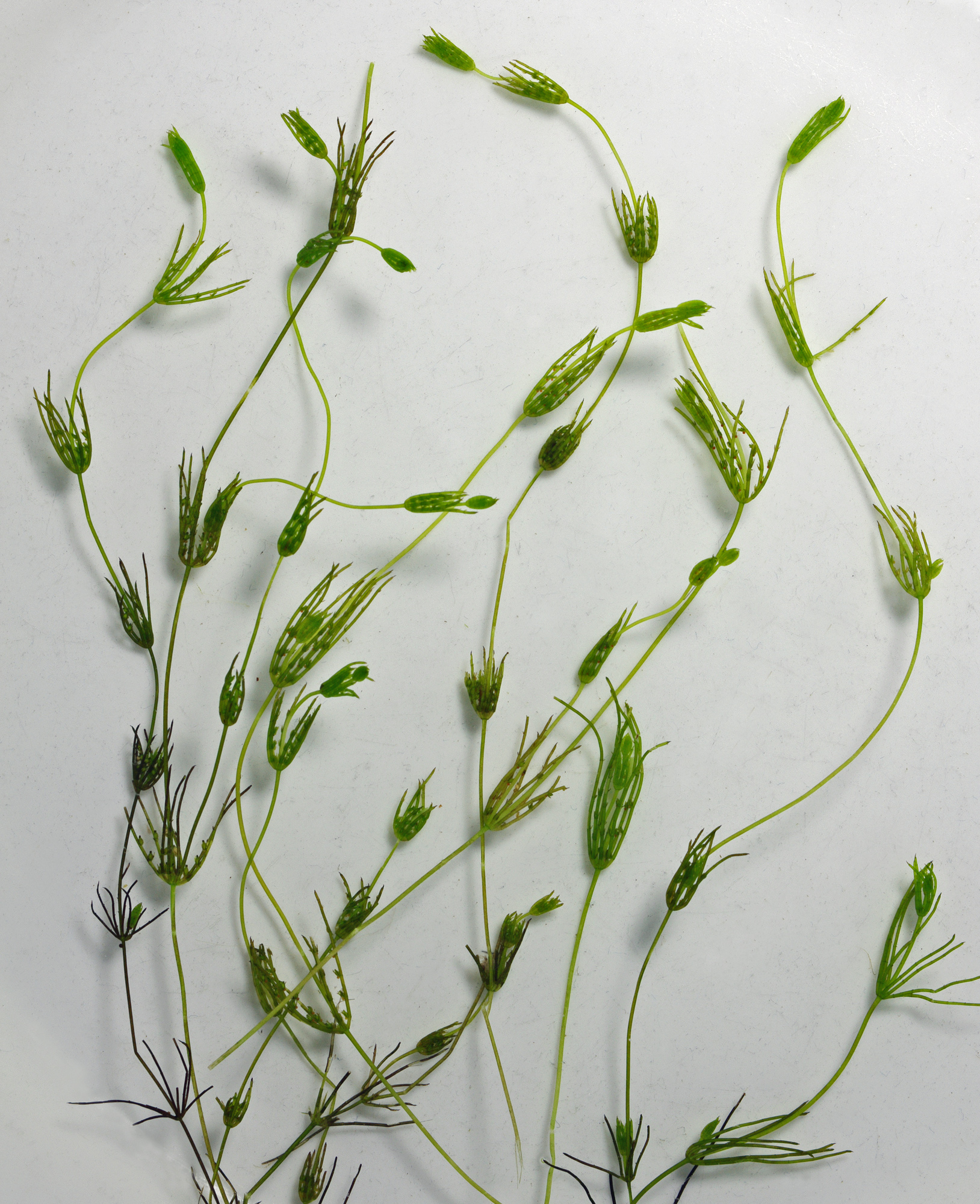
- Chara globularis

Scientific classification
- Kingdom: Plantae
- Division: Charophyta
- Class: Charophyceae; Rabenhorst

Orders
- Charales; †Moellerinales; †Sycidiales; †Umbellinales

= Charophyceae =

Class of Charophyte green algae

Charophyceae is a class of charophyte green algae. AlgaeBase places it in division Charophyta. Extant (living) species are placed in a single order Charales, commonly known as "stoneworts" and "brittleworts". Fossil members of the class may be placed in separate orders, e.g. Sycidiales.

Charophyceae is basal in the Phragmoplastophyta clade which contains the embryophytes (land plants). In 2018, the first nuclear genome sequence from a species belonging to the Charophyceae was published: that of Chara braunii.

== Description ==
The thallus is erect with regular nodes and internodes. At each node there is a whorl of branches. The whole plant is calcified and Equisetum-like. The internodes of the main axis consist of a single elongated cell, in Chara the internodes are corticated covering the main axis. In other genera these are absent. Where there is a single row of cortical cells the cortex is referred to as diplostichous, where there are two rows of cortical cells it is termed triplostichous. The intermodal cells elongate and do not divide, they become many times longer than broad.

=== Evolution ===
Below is a consensus reconstruction of green algal relationships, mainly based on molecular data.

- Streptophyta/ charophyta
  - Mesostigmatophyceae
    - Mesostigmatales
    - - Spirotaenia
      - Chlorokybales
  - - Klebsormidiophyceae
    - Phragmoplastophyta
      - Charophyceae
      - - Coleochaetophyceae
        - - - Zygnematophyceae
          - Embryophytes (land plants)
