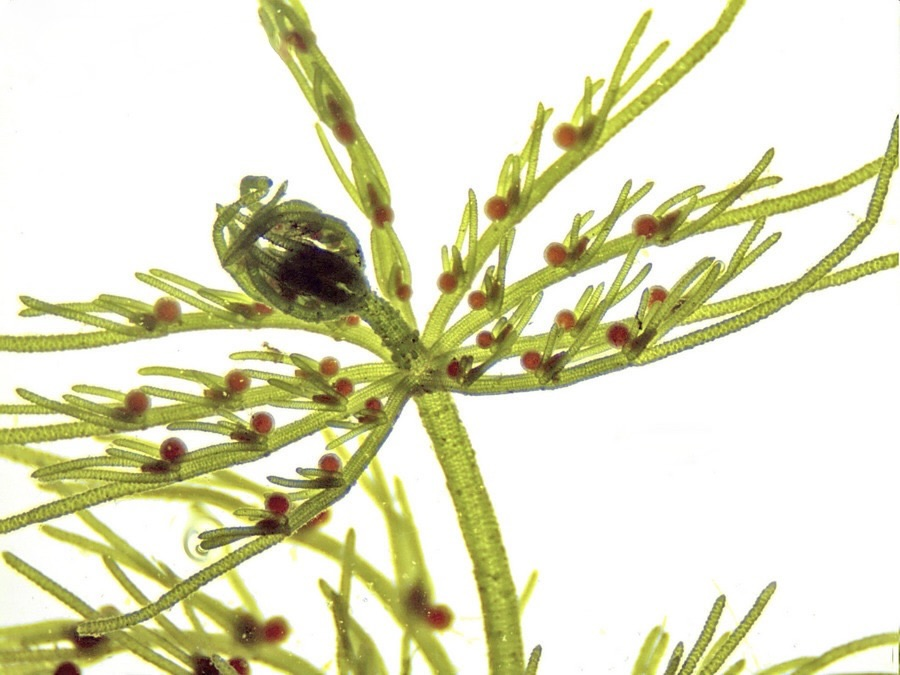
- Light micrograph of Chara vulgaris showing a nodal region with reproductive structures

Scientific classification
- Domain: Eukaryota
- Clade: Archaeplastida
- Clade: Viridiplantae
- Division: Charophyta
- Class: Charophyceae
- Order: Charales
- Family: Characeae
- Genus: Chara
- Species: C. vulgaris

Binomial name
- Chara vulgaris L., 1753

Subspecies
- Chara vulgaris excelsa (T. F. Allen) R. Wood; Chara vulgaris vulgaris Linnaeus

= Chara vulgaris =

Species of alga

Chara vulgaris, also called the common stonewort, is a species of charophyte green alga. It is one of the most widespread species of the genus Chara and occurs across much of Europe, Asia, Africa, North America, and Australia.

The thallus of Chara vulgaris is macroscopic and highly organized, consisting of a main axis differentiated into nodes and elongated internodes. At each node, a whorl of branchlets is produced. The organism is anchored to the substrate by rhizoids. The species is relatively polymorphic in its organization.

The species is of ecological importance in aquatic environments. It is particularly common in alkaline waters rich in calcium bicarbonate (CaCO_{3}) and can tolerate moderate eutrophication, although dense populations are often associated with relatively clear water conditions.

== Description ==
Chara vulgaris is a medium-sized stonewort that typically reaches up to 50 cm in length. The thallus is usually greyish-green to green in colour and is often moderately encrusted with calcium carbonate. The main axis is corticated, with a cortex consisting of a primary cortical row and a single secondary row between adjacent primary rows (diplostichous).

Spine cells are generally small and solitary, although they may become elongated. When well developed, these spine cells are often pressed against the axis and appear to lie within the grooves formed by the cortical rows, a condition known as aulacanthy. The species is highly variable, however, and some forms may show cortical rows of nearly equal width (isostichous).

== Ecology ==
C. vulgaris can form extensive underwater meadows that provide habitat for invertebrates, refuge for fish larvae, and feeding grounds for waterfowl. Dense stands reduce sediment resuspension and can improve water clarity by competing with phytoplankton for nutrients. Because of these ecological functions, charophyte communities are used as indicators of freshwater ecosystem quality. C. vulgaris has been evaluated for its phytoremediation potential.

=== Distribution ===
The species is widely distributed and occurs throughout much of the world in freshwater habitats, including ponds, ditches, littoral pools and periodic waters. The alga can grow down to one meter deep. C. vulgaris is also known to survive in moderately saline conditions.

== Reproduction ==
The reproductive organs of C. vulgaris are among the most structurally complex found in algae. The species is monoecious, bearing both male and female gametangia on the same individual. The spherical orange-red structures are antheridia, which produce multiflagellate sperm cells, while the adjacent elongated oogonia contain a single egg cell. Following fertilization, a resistant oospore is formed that can survive adverse environmental conditions and germinate when conditions improve. Reproductivity is highest in early summer, but can start as early as February in warmer regions.

== Gallery ==
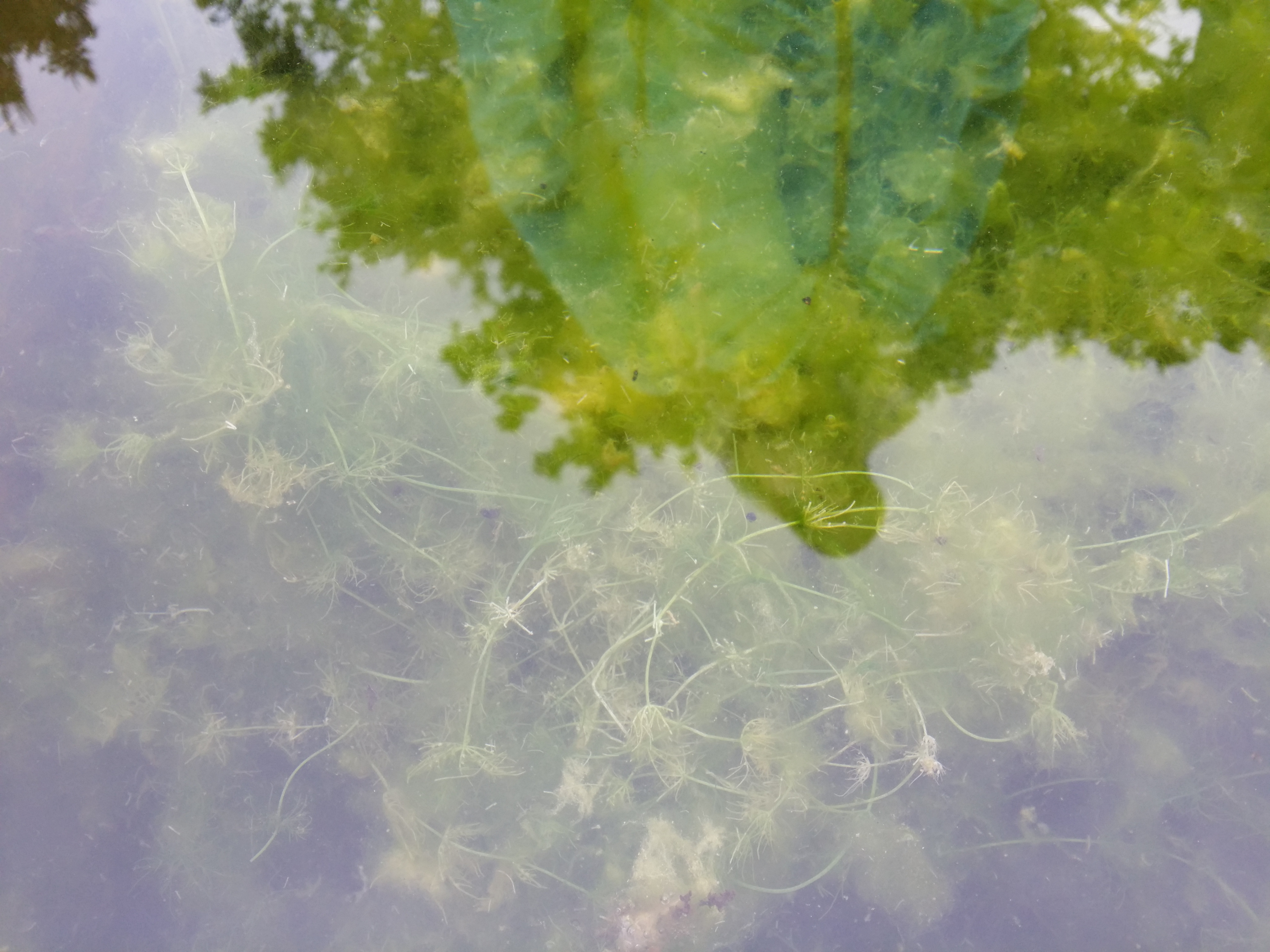
View from above

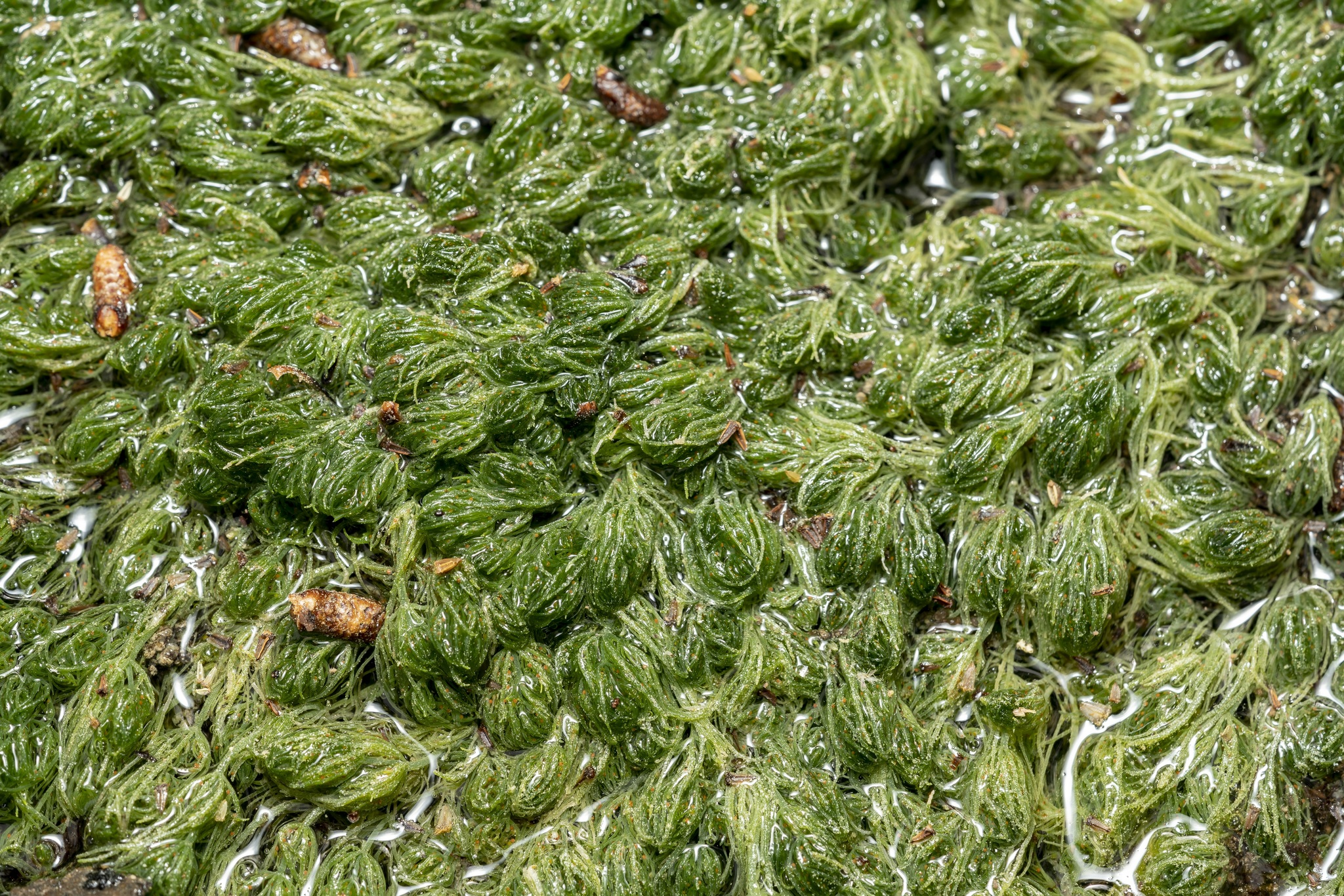
Low water level

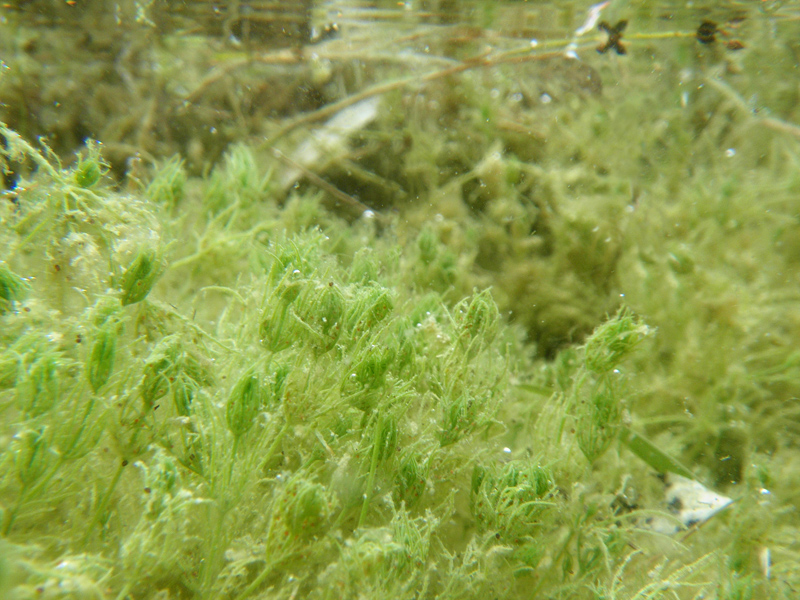
Underwater view

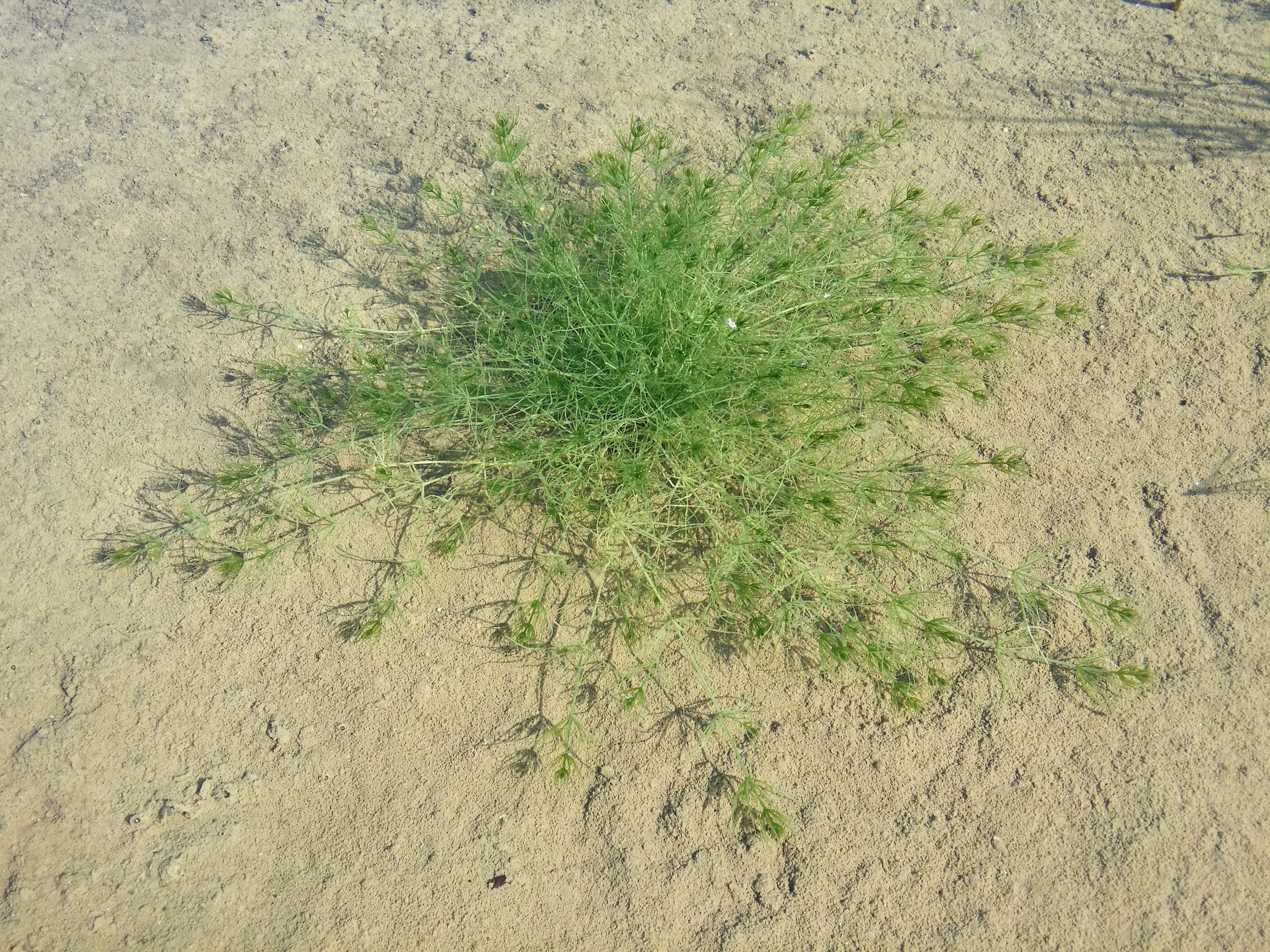
Individual plant

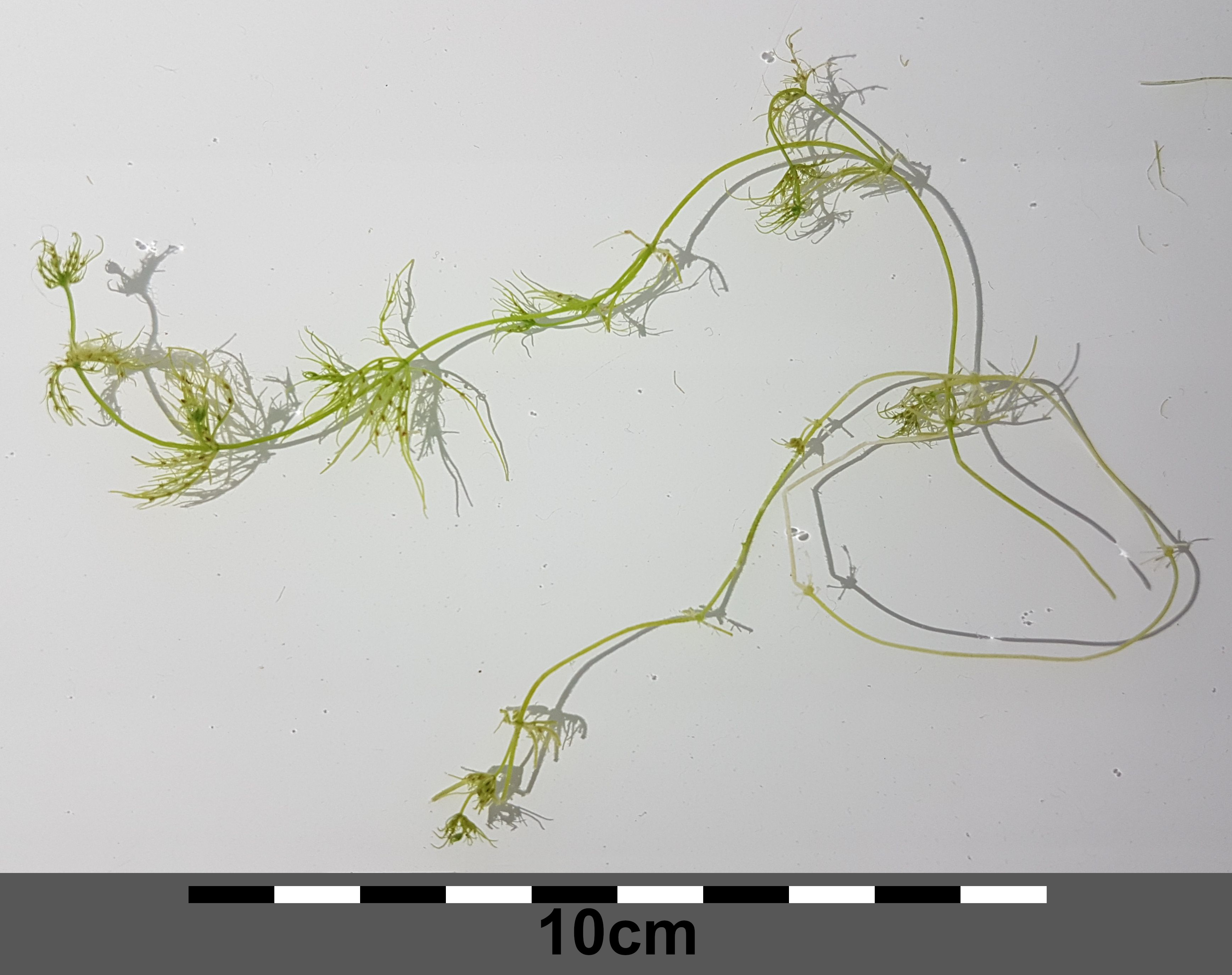
Individual stem

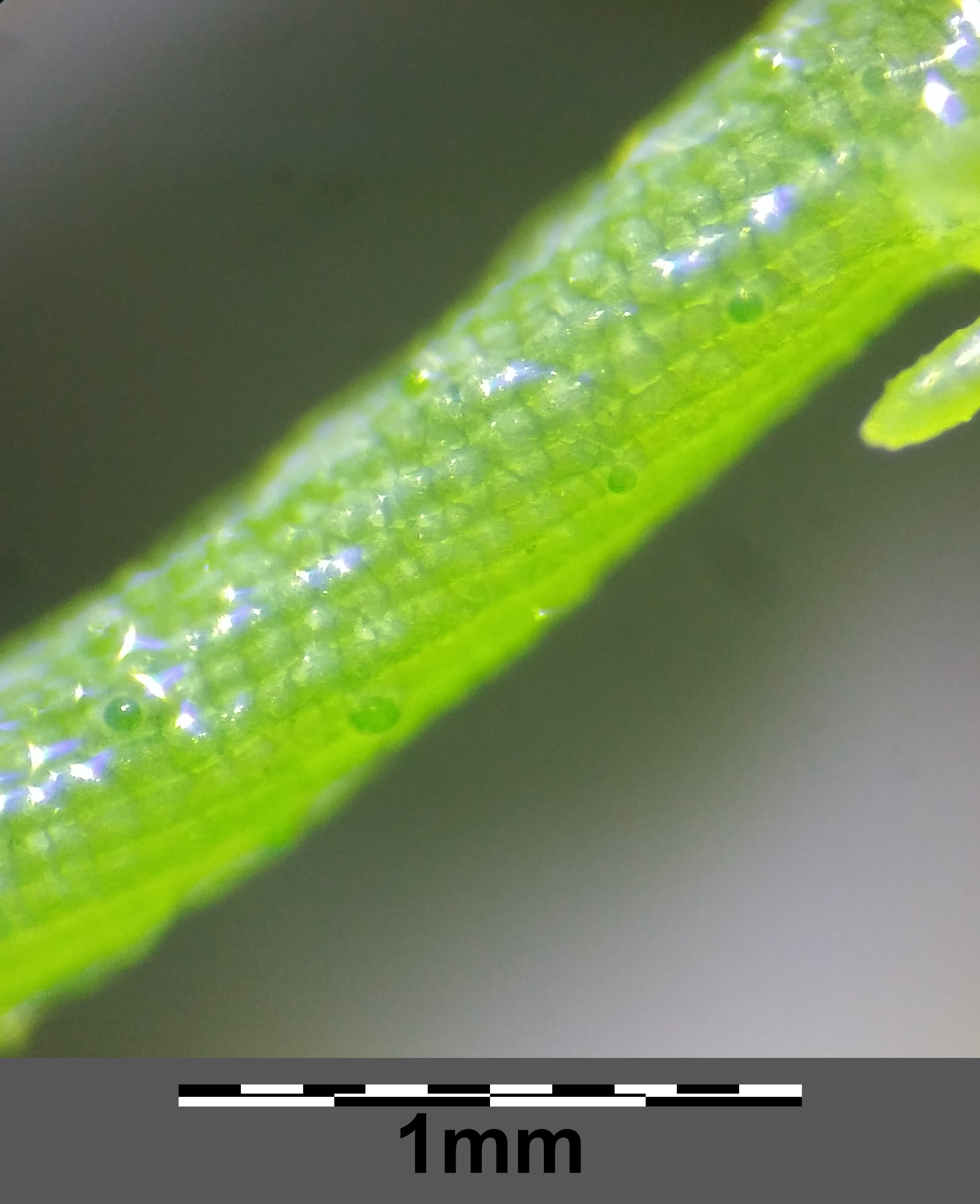
Corticated stem with tylacanth spines

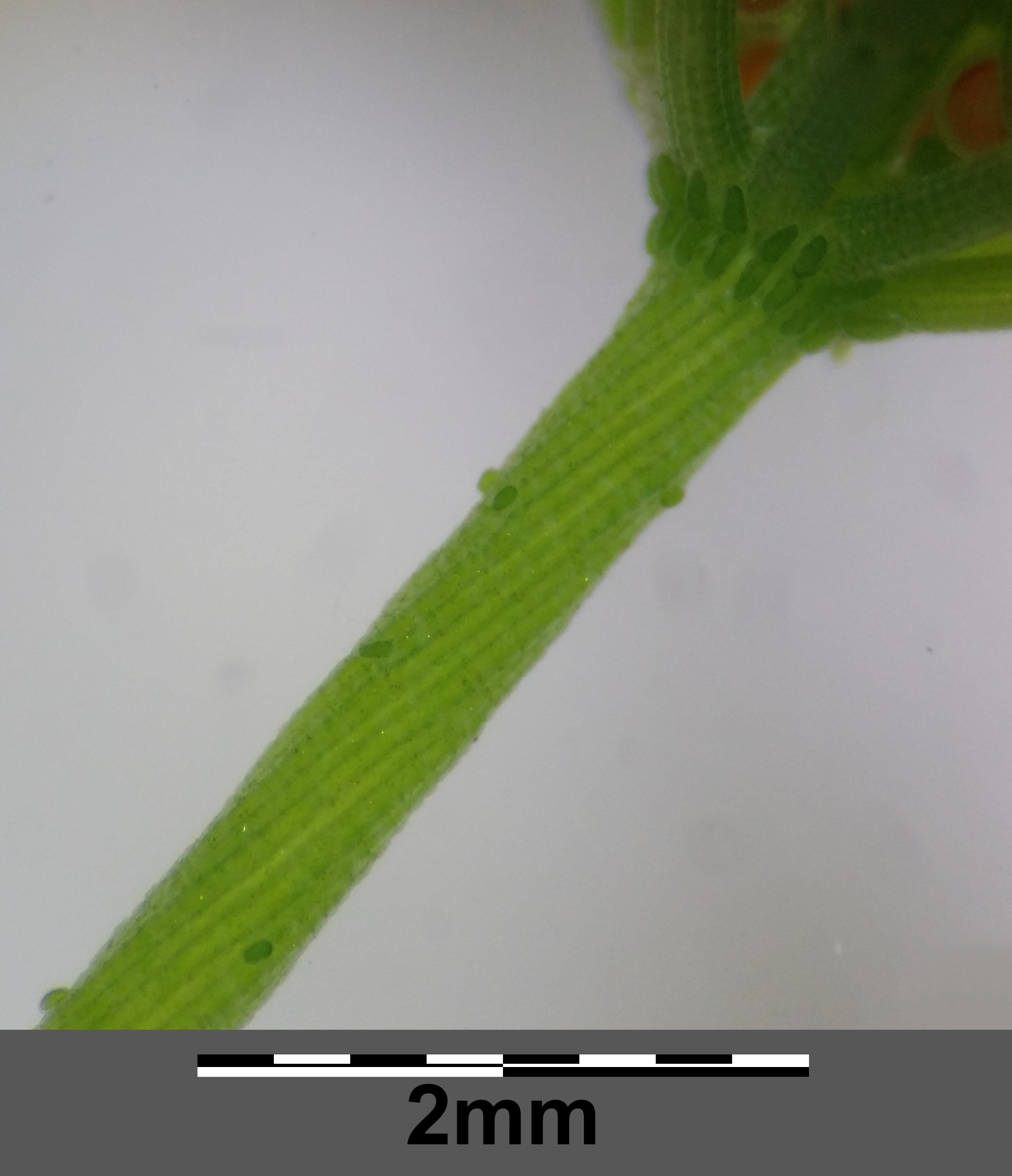
Whorl of branches with stipular spines

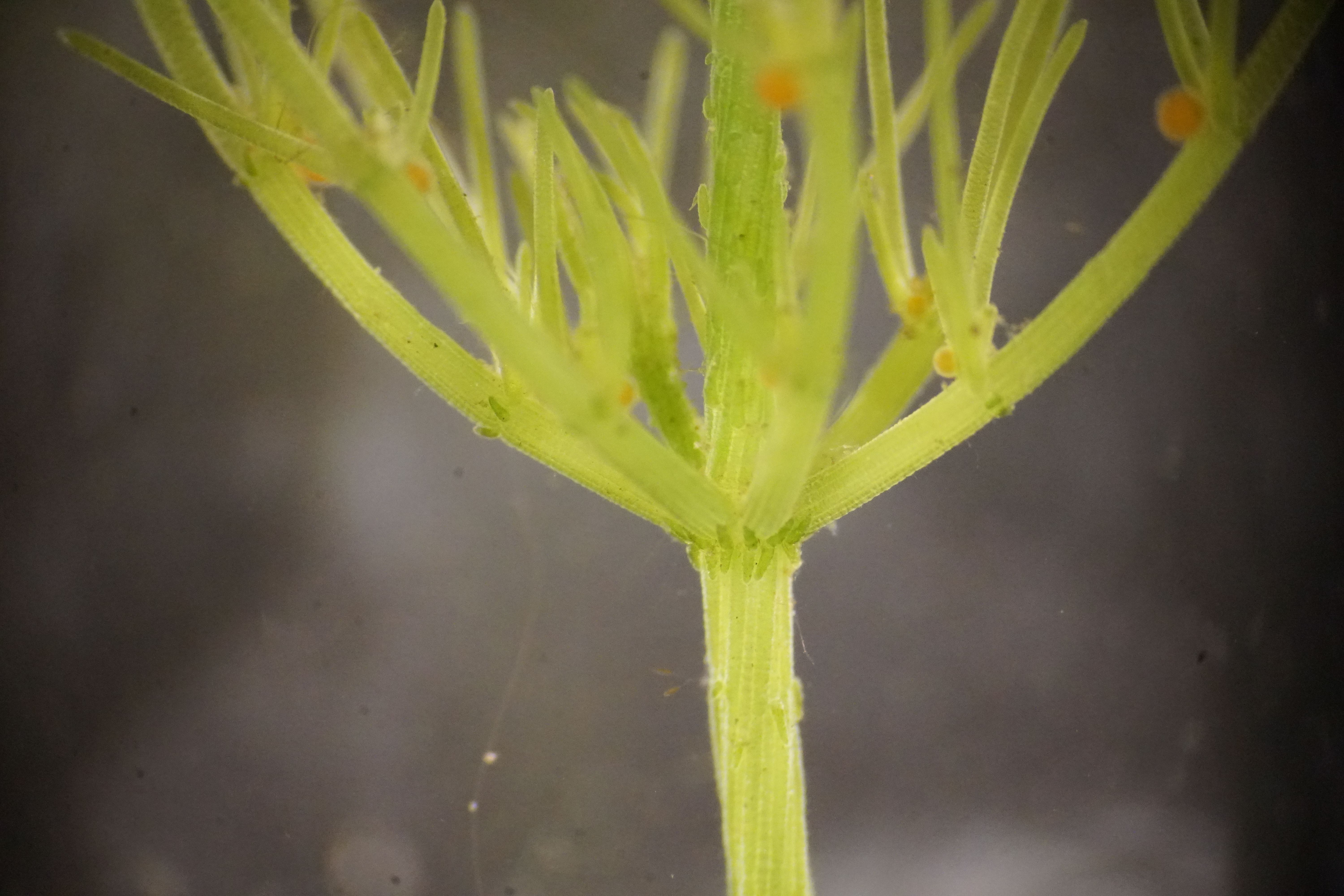
Spikes between bark cells

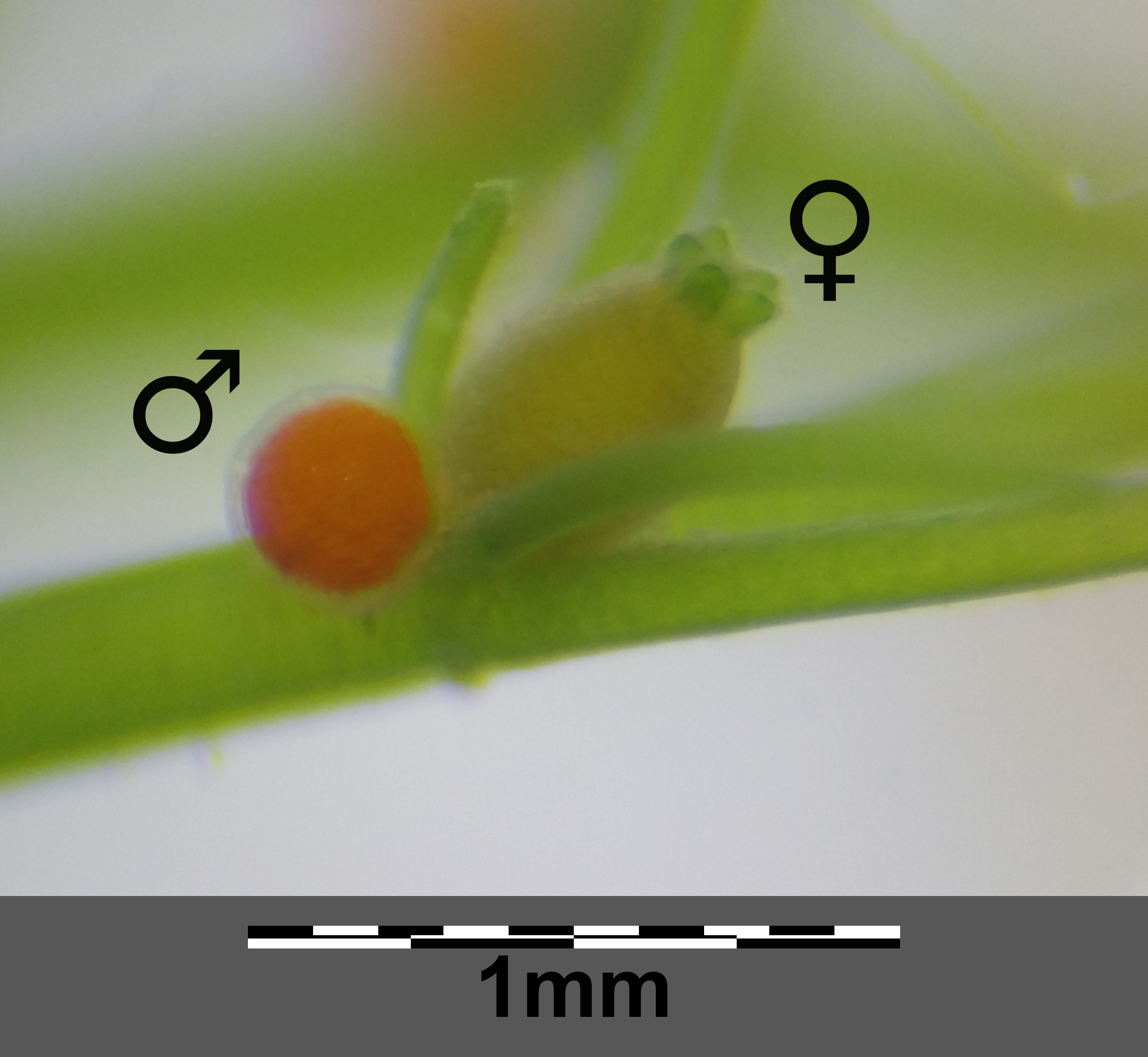
Antheridium (♂) und Oogonium (♀)

=== Illustrations ===
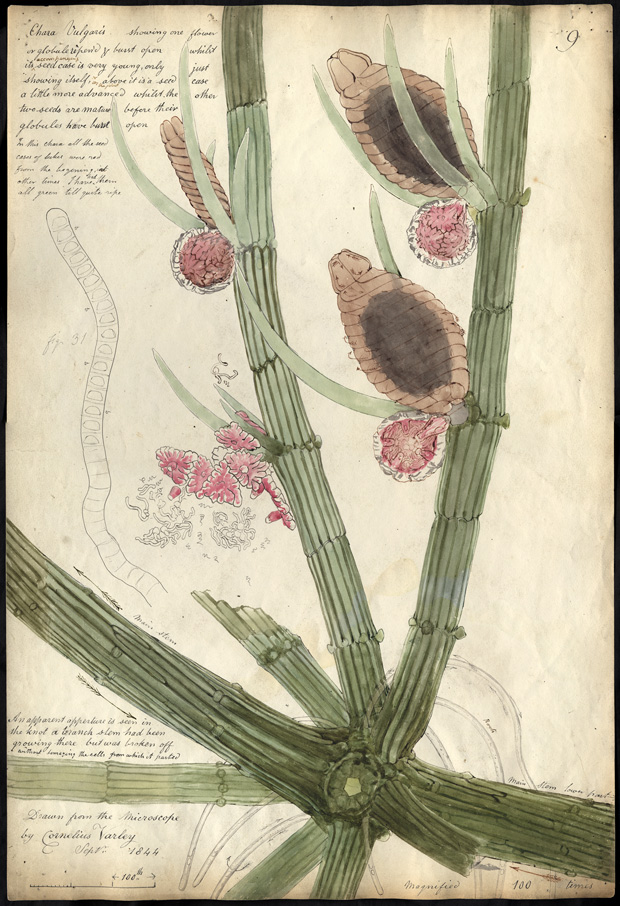
Whorl

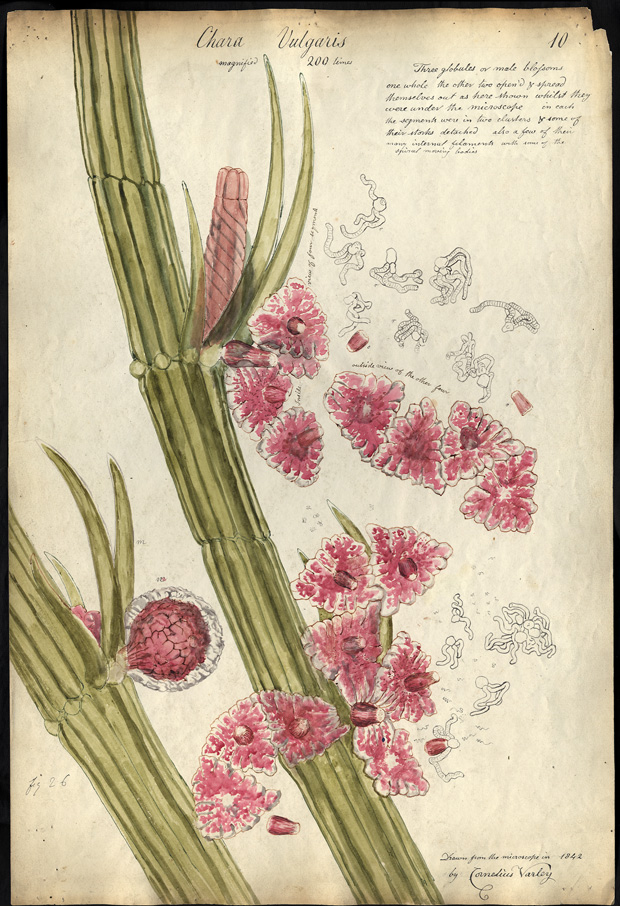
Globules

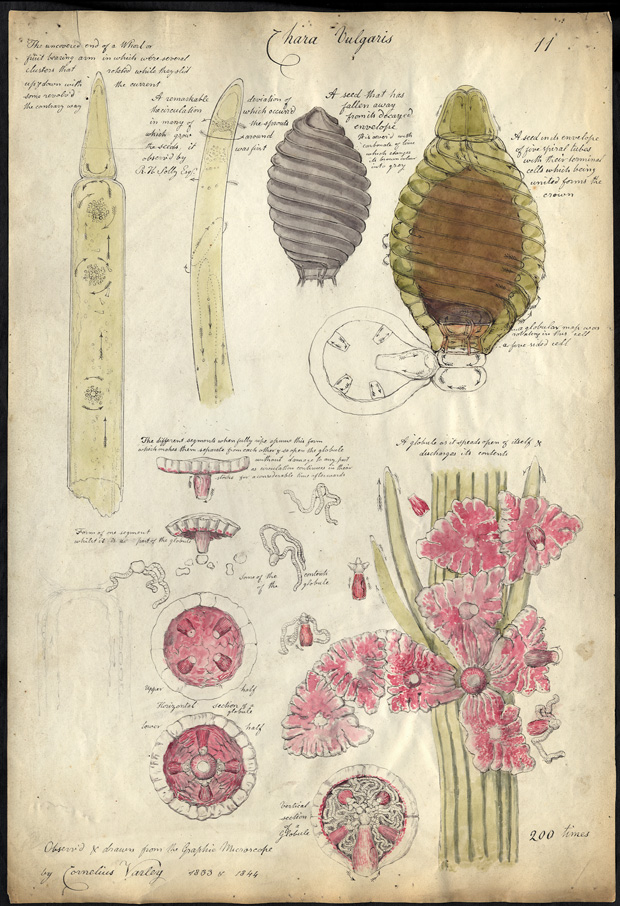
Globule dissection

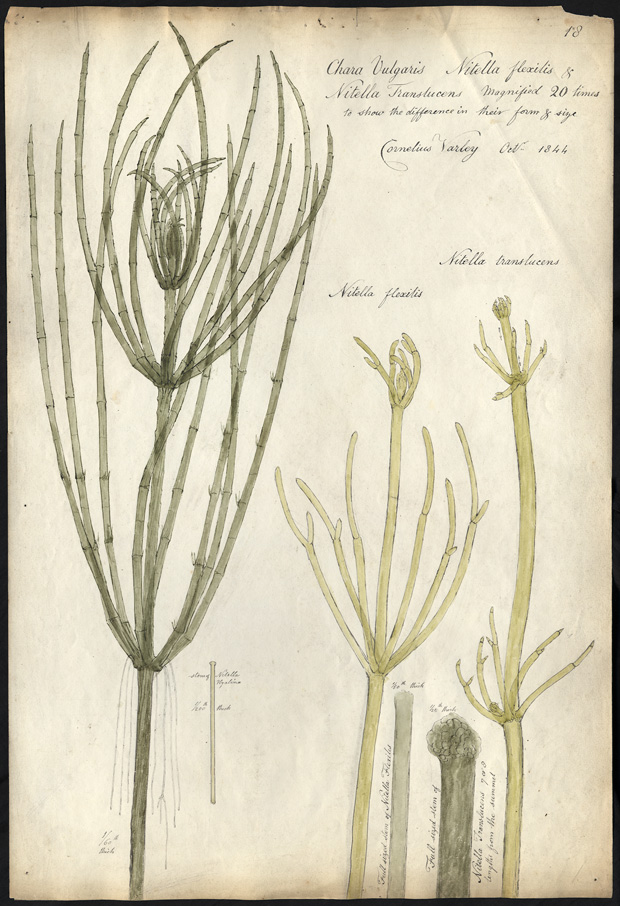
Comparison with Nitella

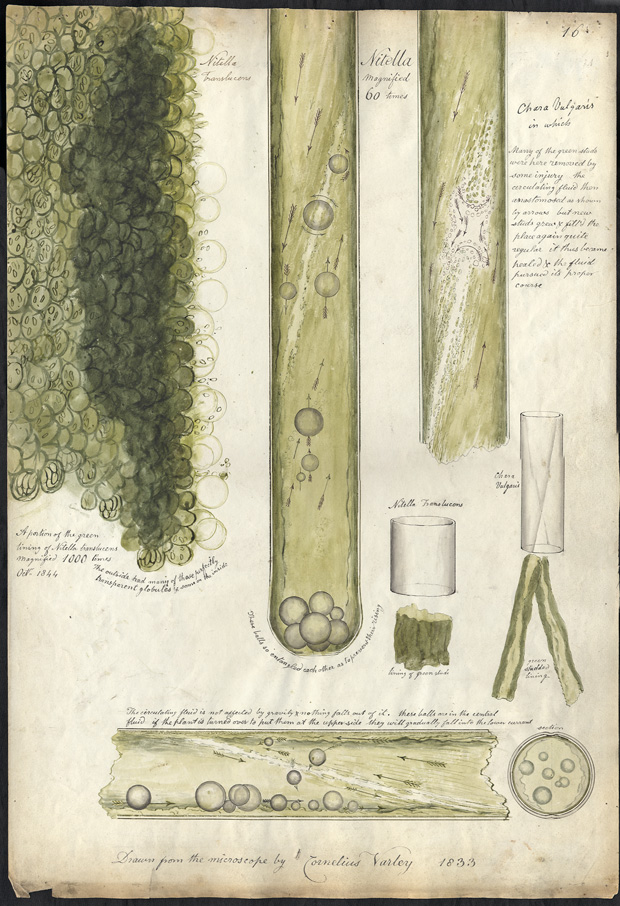
Comparison with Nitella (detail)

== See also ==
- List of sequenced plastomes
