= Chara elegans =

Scientific classification
- Clade: Viridiplantae
- (unranked): Charophyta
- Class: Charophyceae
- Order: Charales
- Family: Characeae
- Genus: Chara
- Species: C. elegans

Binomial name
- Chara elegans (A. Braun) Robinson, 1906

Species of alga

Chara elegans is a green alga species in the genus Chara.
