= Paul D'Andrea =

Paul Philip D’Andrea (born February 2, 1939) is an American playwright, academic, and theatrical producer. D'Andrea is known for his plays exploring religious tolerance, gritty slivers of Americana, major world figures like Saladin and Einstein, and the ethics of science.

== Early life and education ==
D’Andrea was born in the South End neighborhood of Boston to Italian immigrant parents. His father was a professional surveyor and civil engineer who died when D’Andrea was 24. His mother was a seamstress who had left formal schooling after the 8th grade to start working full-time. D’Andrea attended Belmont High School, where he was class president and valedictorian. He won a Harvard National scholarship to Harvard University, where he earned a BA in Physics magna cum laude. He then attended Oxford University on a Fulbright scholarship, pursuing a degree in Philosophy. His course of study in England was interrupted by an illness in the family, which forced him to return to Boston. Back at Harvard, he earned an MA in English literature and a PhD in Renaissance literature (with a focus on Shakespeare).

== Career ==
D'Andrea has had positions at Harvard University, University of Chicago, and George Mason University, where he raised theories on “new ideas that range across scholarly disciplines” and taught courses on humanities and science that offered equal amounts of mathematics and literary criticism, according to the Washington Post. His theories on Shakespeare have been published by Harvard University Press, and his scholarly work has been recognized with Rockefeller Foundation, Woodrow Wilson Foundation, and McKnight Foundation fellowships.

D’Andrea began his faculty career as a resident tutor in English Literature at Harvard. He then became assistant professor of English Literature at the University of Chicago, and then chairman of the humanities program at the University of Minnesota.

In 1985, he was recruited to become a Clarence J. Robinson endowed chair professor at George Mason University (along with physicist James Trefil, political scientist Hugh Heclo, philosopher Thelma Levine, and Pulitzer-Prize winning civil rights activist Roger Wilkins) as part of what the Washington Post called the university’s “aggressive campaign to use more than $5 million to attract 20 star professors.”

While at George Mason, D’Andrea won the 2015 Virginia State Council of Higher Education Outstanding Faculty Award for his teaching, playwriting, and scholarly work regarding Renaissance Art, Philosophy and Literature; views of gender from Aristophanes through Much Ado about Nothing to Sex and the City; the moral vision of contemporary drama; and Shakespeare.” In his article entitled, “Thou Starre of Poets: Shakespeare as DNA,” published by Harvard University Press, D’Andrea introduced the literary concept of Shakespeare as DNA, the idea that the Bard’s dramatic writing can be viewed as the genome sequence for much of the English language.

Inspired by his interest in Shakespeare the playwright, D’Andrea became one himself. D’Andrea was playwright-in-residence at the Sundance Institute and at Dale Wasserman’s Playlabs. He engaged in collaborative workshops at Charles Fuller’s theater in Harlem and at Hull House in Chicago. He also became a member of New Dramatists in New York, where he was a resident playwright and developed his plays in artistic collaboration with Alan Schneider.

== Plays ==
D’Andrea’s first major theatrical success, The Trouble with Europe, was described by the Los Angeles Times as “a hilarious allegory” about the cultural winding-down of Europe and the energies needed to revive it. Debuting at the Mark Taper Forum Theater in Los Angeles, it featured Jonathan Frakes in the starring role and was chosen by the American Theater Critics Association as Best Play West of 1978-79. The play is published by Samuel French. Excerpts from The Trouble with Europe are included in 100 Monologues, a book anthology of the best theatrical monologues.

D’Andrea’s play A Full-Length Portrait of America premiered at the Actors Theater of Louisville as part of the Humana Festival of New American Plays and won ATL’s Great American Play Prize. D’Andrea’s play Bully won the CBS/Dramatists Guild Foundation Prize in 1987.

=== Nathan the Wise ===
In 2001, D’Andrea’s adaptation of Gotthold Lessing's classic on religious tolerance, Nathan The Wise, was produced in Washington D.C., and it met with critical acclaim. The Washington Post called the play “a parable for our times” that “brings warmth and humor to a tale of Muslim, Jew, and Christian in Crusade-ravaged 12-century Jerusalem.” WETA-TV called it “a new model of understanding among diverse groups.” Washington Jewish Week wrote that “[t]he play attains a measure of holiness in its quest for a bond among Jerusalem’s three great religions” and quoted D’Andrea as saying “I want to challenge people to transcend thinking in terms of the other in order to rethink in terms of commonality.” D’Andrea’s Nathan the Wise (which he wrote based on his wife Gisela D’Andrea’s translation of the original German Lessing play) was nominated for the Charles MacArthur Award for Outstanding New Play at the 2002 Helen Hayes Awards. Also in 2002, Nathan the Wise was filmed and produced as a 90-minute feature on PBS station WETA-TV.

The Goethe Institute wrote that “D’Andrea's radical adaptation for the 21st century of Lessing's Nathan the Wise, centered on the idea of informed mutual respect, is taught in international conflict resolution courses both in the United States and abroad.” In 2003, the Vatican—in partnership with the Italian Ministry of Culture and Centro Dionysia—featured Nathan the Wise as the artistic centerpiece at an inter-religious conclave on tolerance. For this production, the play was translated into Italian as Nathan il Saggio, and the performance was aired on Italian state television, RAI. Universities across the country incorporate performances of Nathan the Wise into their religious tolerance initiatives. In 2006, F. Murray Abraham starred in a performance of Nathan the Wise. Noting that “21st century audiences warmly received” D’Andrea’s Nathan, Abraham stated that he believed “actors can have a role in diplomacy” and help “spread the message of peace” by performing in this play, because it presents a vision of characters from the “three great religions” able to “exist side by side.”

=== The Einstein Project and Two-Bit Taj Mahal ===
With Jon Klein, D’Andrea wrote the play The Einstein Project. It is published by Dramatists Play Service, which describes the play as “a highly theatrical journey into one of the most fascinating minds of the modern age.” In 2009, The Einstein Project was produced at the Berkshire Theater Festival. Playbill cites the Berkshire Theater Festival’s description of The Einstein Project as “a fascinating look at one of the titans of the 20th century: Albert Einstein. This truly unique theatrical experience seeks to humanize and contextualize a man that we all think we know. Through conversations with his son Edmund and his colleagues, we are able to truly visualize the man who, however reluctantly, ushered in the Atomic Age."

In 2008, D’Andrea’s play Two-Bit Taj Mahal premiered at Theater of the First Amendment in Washington, D.C. The Washington Post called the play “a ripping yarn, based on an unsolved FBI case, that shimmers with the enigmatic grandeur of a fairy tale.” The “unsolved FBI case” that The Washington Post referred to is a real event which D’Andrea researched by traveling to the American town of Skidmore, Missouri, where he interviewed the citizens who had voted to kill their local bully. Two-Bit Taj Mahal is published by Dramatic Publishing.

In 2014, Deadline Hollywood reported that D’Andrea’s one-act play Win Win had won the 2014 Writers Competition held by “Harvardwood, the Harvard University-sanctioned nonprofit.”
