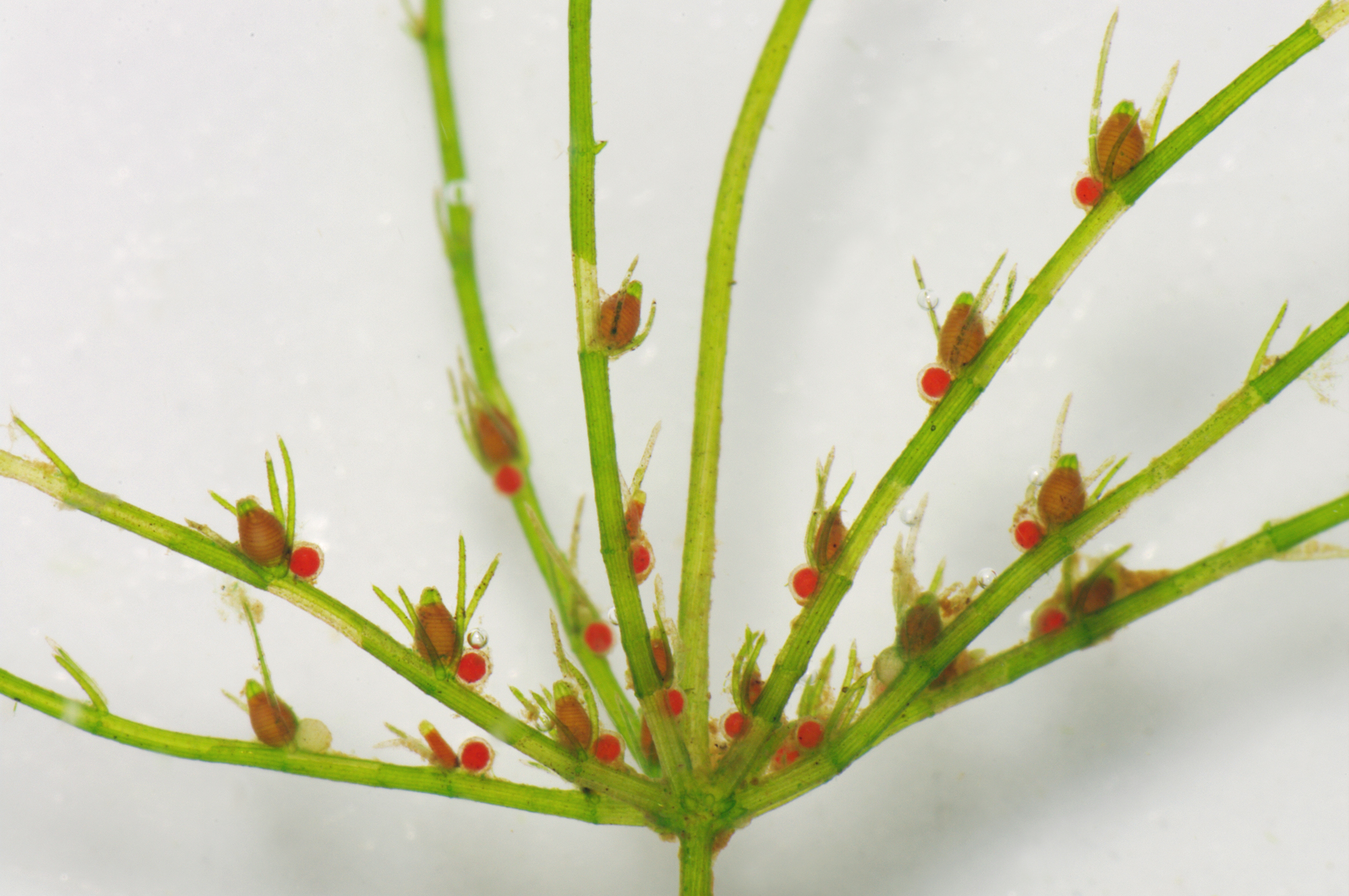
- Chara virgata. Note the typical reproductive organs: male antheridia (red) and female archegonia (brown).

Scientific classification
- Clade: Viridiplantae
- (unranked): Charophyta
- Class: Charophyceae
- Order: Charales
- Family: Characeae
- Genus: Chara
- Species: C. virgata

Binomial name
- Chara virgata Kützing

Synonyms
- Chara delicatula C.Agardh, 1824

= Chara virgata =

Species of green alga

Chara virgata is slender, branched freshwater green alga.

== Description ==
Chara virgata grows to 30 cm in length. Its structure is unlike any other alga. It has a main axis of elongated nodes with whorled laterals. In colour it is dark green.
