= Brown v. Board of Commissioners of the City of Chattanooga =

1989 United States federal court case

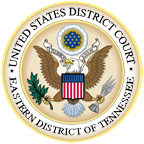
- Court: United States District Court for the Eastern District of Tennessee
- Full case name: Dr. Tommie Brown v. Board of Commissioners of the City of Chattanooga
- Decided: August 8, 1989
- Docket nos.: CIV-1-87-388
- Citation: 722 F. Supp. 380

Court membership
- Judge sitting: Robert Allan Edgar

Brown v. The Board of Commissioners of the City of Chattanooga, 722 F. Supp. 380 (E.D. Tenn. 1989), was the restructuring of the election process of Chattanooga's Board of Commissioners due to its unconstitutionality as it contradicted Section 2 of the Federal Voting Rights Act of 1965. Filed by twelve citizens in November 1987 under the United States District Court for the Eastern District of Tennessee, Southern Division, the case provided for a more equally distributed representation of the citizens, particularly the city's minority groups, of Chattanooga, Tennessee.

== Background ==
After the Civil War, Black people entered into city government and politics. They made up a substantial number of representatives in the fire department, education departments, and police departments. For example, in 1881, a Chattanooga police force included seven Black members out of a total of twelve. Out of fear and anger for the Black political control in Chattanooga, a group of White people elected to amend the city's charter to require a poll tax, strict voting registration processes involving literacy tests and advanced registration, the governor's appointment of the police force, and a shift from five aldermen to six. In 1901, the Tennessee legislature once again revised the city's charter to create a bicameral city government containing alderman and councilmen, leading to the elimination of Black people in political life.

Following the city's charter establishment in 1839 by the General Assembly of the State of Tennessee, its governmental system was elected through an at-large voting process where a nearly all-White slate of candidates participated in the election to the five-member board with four-year terms. Candidates were chosen by a majority vote, but most voters were identified as White or non-residential property owners, eliminating the opportunity for an equal representation of the 31.69% (as of 1980) of the Black population and residents.

The Commission included the positions of Mayor, Chief Officer of Finances, Commissioner of Fire and Police, Commissioner of Education and Health, Commissioner of Public Utilities, Grounds and Buildings, and Commissioner of Public Works, Streets and Airports. Each member was elected from the population at large; therefore, the Commission represented only the majority White population of the Chattanooga area, not the Black minority.

White men continued to dominate the Commission post even after 1971, when John Franklin, the only Black candidate to have ever been elected, became a part of the otherwise all-White governmental board, and was reelected until its termination. Since the first Black candidate ran for the Commission in 1955, only fifteen Black candidates attempted election to the Commission up to 1988. John Franklin was the only one to succeed.

== Case ==
The issue was initially presented by Lorenzo Ervin, Annie Thomas, and Maxine Cousin (all leaders of Concerned Citizens for Justice) to the ACLU in Atlanta. The lawsuit's plaintiffs were Tommie Brown, Leamon Pierce, Herbert H. Wright, J.K. Brown, Annie D. Thomas, Johnny W. Holloway, George A. Key, Lorenzo Ervin, Bobby Ward, Norma Crowder, Maxine B. Cousins, and Buford McElrath. Chattanooga's Board of Commissioners, named as defendants, were (mayor) Gene Roberts, Ervin Dinsmore, John Franklin, Pat Rose, and Ron Littlefield. After being filed in 1987 as a complaint against the systematic political underrepresentation of the Black population in Chattanooga, the case was taken on by U.S. District Judge R. Allan Edgar. In 1989, Edgar decided that the at-large voting of the commission-style government violated the federal Voting Rights Act of 1965 by failing to allow minority voters of the city to achieve political representation. Following the case of Brown v. Board of Commissioners of Chattanooga, the city terminated the at-large voting system, its commission, and voting privileges for non-resident property owners. In return, the city chose to develop nine districts to represent the various neighborhoods, people, and cultures around Chattanooga, while creating a mayor-council form of government in 1991 whose representatives were elected by 9 separate voting districts, at least 3 of which have a 60-65% majority Black population, instead of through a city-wide at-large voting system.

== Local Outcome ==
As a result of the elimination of the commission and the development of the mayor-council government, Chattanooga's legislative branch is now represented by the following members from each of the nine districts: Chip Henderson (District 1, European-American), Jerry Mitchell (District 2, European-American), Ken Smith (District 3, European-American), Larry Grohn (District 4, European-American), Russell Gilbert (District 5, African-American), Carol Berz (District 6, European-American), Chris Anderson (District 7, European-American), Moses Freeman (District 8, African-American), and Yusuf Hakeem (District 9, African-American). Current members of the council are more representative of the people and issues of their individual districts (6 European-Americans, 3 African-Americans in a city of 36% African-American population) rather than the concerns of the majority White property owners.
