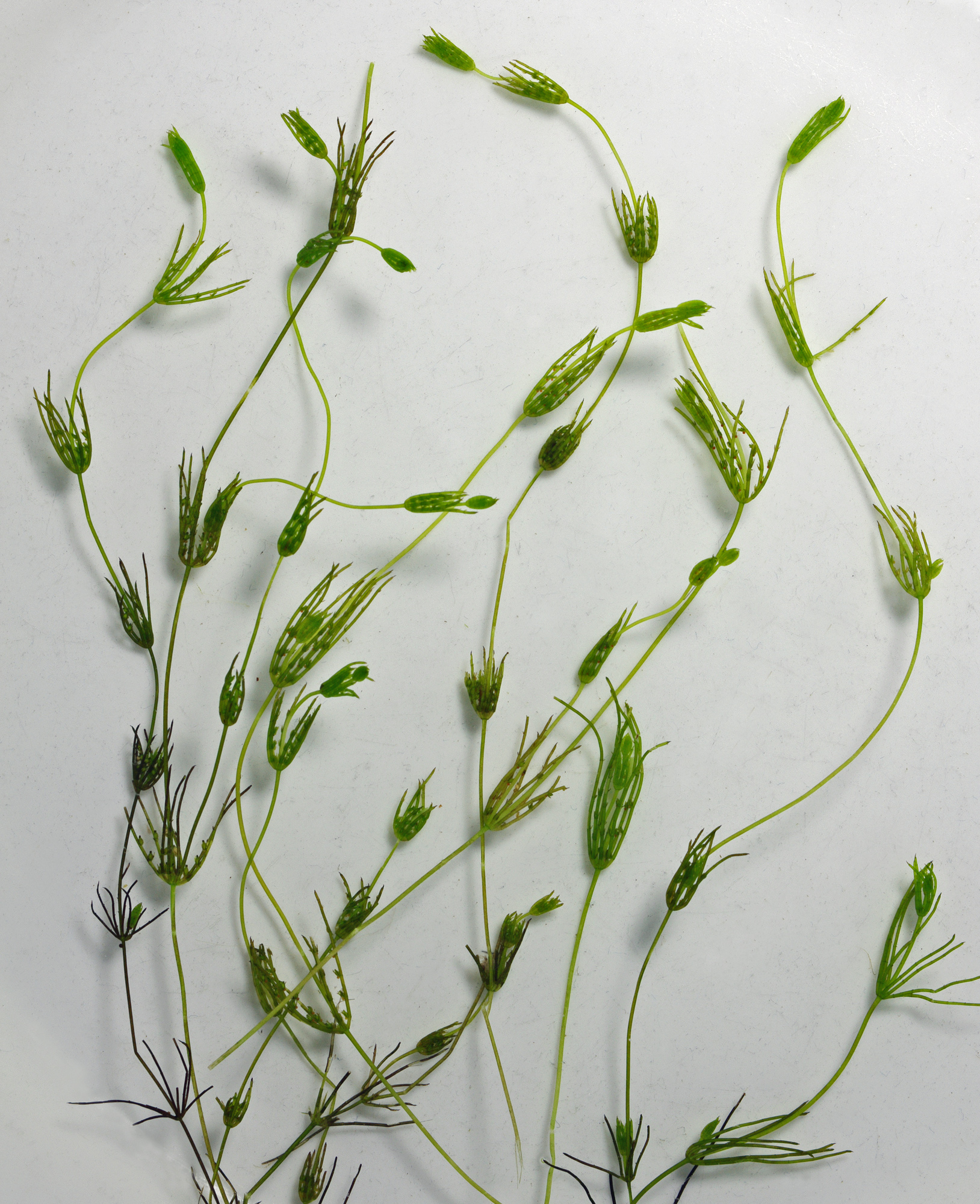
- Chara globularis

Scientific classification
- Domain: Eukaryota
- Clade: Archaeplastida
- Clade: Viridiplantae
- Division: Charophyta
- Class: Charophyceae
- Order: Charales
- Family: Characeae
- Genus: Chara; L., 1753

Species
- See text

= Chara (alga) =

Chara Temporal range: Silurian–Recent

Genus of green algae

Chara is a genus of charophyte green algae in the family Characeae. They are multicellular and superficially resemble land plants because of stem-like and leaf-like structures. They are found in freshwater, particularly in limestone areas throughout the northern temperate zone, where they grow submerged, attached to the muddy bottom. They prefer less oxygenated and hard water and are generally not found in waters where mosquito larvae are present.

The species are covered with calcium carbonate (CaCO_{3}) deposits and are hence commonly known as stoneworts. Cyanobacteria have been found growing as epiphytes on the surfaces of Chara, where they may be involved in fixing nitrogen, which is important to plant nutrition.

== Structure ==
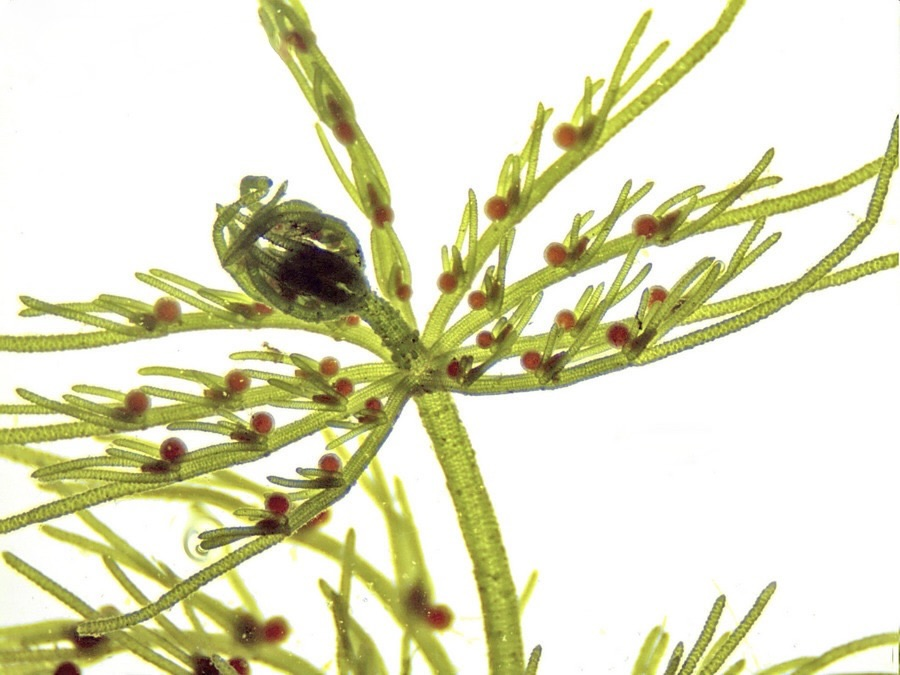
Light micrograph of Chara vulgaris showing a nodal region with reproductive structures

The branching system of Chara species is complex with branches derived from apical cells which cut off segments at the base to form nodal and internodal cells alternately. The main axes bear whorls of branches in a superficial resemblance to Equisetum (a vascular plant). They are typically anchored to the littoral substrate by means of branching underground rhizoids. Chara plants are rough to the touch because of deposited calcium salts on the cell wall. The metabolic processes associated with this deposition often give Chara plants a distinctive and unpleasant smell of hydrogen sulfide.

== Morphology ==
The plant body is a gametophyte. It consists of the main axis (differentiated into nodes and internodes), dimorphic branches (long branch of unlimited growth and short branches of limited growth), rhizoids (multicellular with oblique septa) and stipulodes (needle-shaped structures at the base of secondary laterals).

== Reproduction ==
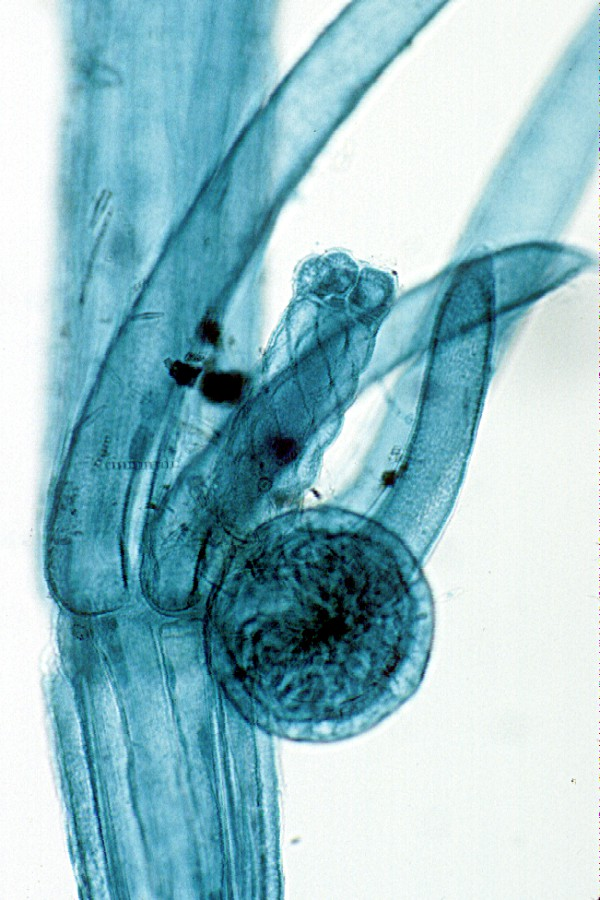
Light micrograph of a whole-mount slide of an oogonium (or nucule) and antheridium (or globule) of Chara (conjoined monoicy)

Chara reproduces vegetatively and sexually. Vegetative reproduction takes place by tubers, amylum stars and secondary protonemata. The sex organs are a multicellular and jacketed globule or antheridium (male) and nucule or archegonium (female). The antheridia and archegonia may occur on separate plants (dioicy), together on the same plant (conjoined monoicy) or separately on the same plant (sejoined monoicy).

The reproductive organs of the Charales show a high degree of specialization. The female organ, called an oogonium is a large oval structure with an envelope of spirally arranged, bright green filaments of cells. The male organ or is also large, bright yellow or red in colour, spherical in shape, and is usually termed an antheridium, though some workers regard it as a multiple structure rather than a single organ. The sex organs are developed in pairs from the adaxial nodal cell at the upper nodes of the primary lateral branches, the oogonium being formed above the antheridium. They are sufficiently large to be easily seen with the naked eye, especially the bright orange or red antheridium. Many species are dioecious. In others the monoecious condition is complicated by the development of the antheridium before the formation of the oogonium, thus preventing fertilization by antherozoids of the same alga. In this case the two types of sex organs usually arise from different points on the lateral branches.

All cells of the Charales are haploid except for the fertilized zygote, the large single cell in the interior of the oogonium, which becomes enclosed in a thickened hard wall to form an oospore that awaits favorable conditions for germination. Upon germination the diploid oospore undergoes meiosis, producing four haploid nuclei. A septum divides a small apical cell with one haploid nucleus from a large basal cell containing the other three nuclei, which will slowly degenerate. The oospore apical cell divides to produce the protonemal initial, from which the primary protonema arises, and the rhizoidal initial, from which the primary rhizoid descends. From these the alga continues its development.

== Distribution ==
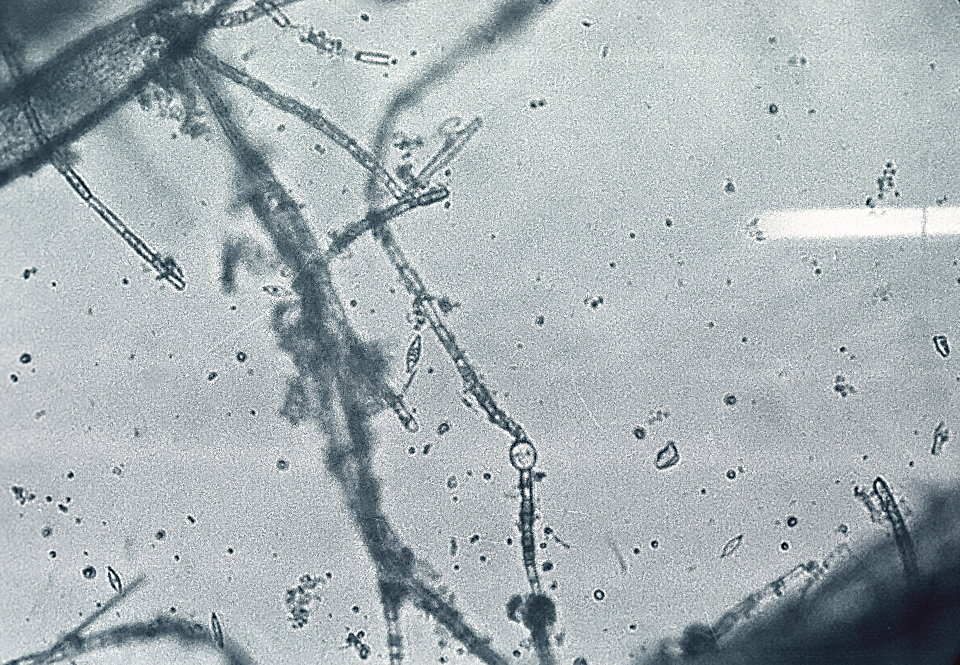
Light micrograph of unidentified cyanobacteria and other biofilm organisms growing as epiphytes on the surface of Chara species in a rice paddy in Louisiana, US

Chara has a cosmopolitan distribution, from 69 degrees north in northern Norway to about 49 degrees south in Kerguelen Islands (Pal et al., 1962). About 51 species are found in India. There are many species of Chara in Europe, where they are commonly found in the specific habitat-type designated as H3140 (hard oligo-mesotrophic waters with benthic vegetation of Chara spp) in the Natura 2000 plans of the European Union.

The Netherlands are home to 20 species of Chara, growing in lakes and ponds of the habitat-type H3140. The H3140 habitats in the Netherlands, are considered important in the overall preservation efforts and therefore also for the Chara species in general.

In Denmark, many former Chara habitats have been polluted by either toxins or excessive amounts of nutrients (in particular phosphates and nitrogen), but a few large lakes and ponds remain. Chara is found growing in the very clean hard water lakes of Thy National Park like Nors Sø for example. Tissø lake (fourth-largest lake in Denmark) is also a H3140 habitat and contains Chara species.

Many species are also present in the British Isles.

== Species ==
Of the over 160 species, some examples include:

- Chara braunii
- Chara canescens
- Chara elegans
- Chara globularis
- Chara hispida
- Chara hornemannii
- Chara virgata
- Chara vulgaris
