= Tennessee House of Representatives 28th district =

State legislative district in Tennessee

Tennessee's 28th State House of Representatives district
- Map of Tennessee House districts, with the 28th District shaded in red
Representative
Yusuf Hakeem; D–Chattanooga
- Demographics: 32.7% White; 60.9% Black; 3.8% Hispanic; 0.8% Asian; 1.8% Other
- Population: 73,251

The Tennessee House of Representatives 28th district is one of 99 legislative districts included in the lower house of the Tennessee General Assembly. It covers the areas surrounding downtown Chattanooga, along with various outer parts of the city, such as East Chattanooga, Brainerd, and Alton Park. The district stretches far to the east, near Chattanooga Metropolitan Airport; to the north, near the Baylor School; and to the south, ending at the Tennessee-Georgia state line. The district has been represented by Yusuf Hakeem, since 2019.

== Demographics ==
- 60.9% of the district is African American
- 32.7% of the district is White
- 3.8% of the district is Hispanic
- 1.5% of the district is two or more races
- 0.8% of the district is Asian
- 0.3% of the district is other than listed

== List of representatives ==
Representative	Party	Years of Service	General Assembly	Residence
Clarence B. Robinson	Democratic	1975-1993	89th, 90th, 91st, 92nd, 93rd, 94th, 95th, 96th, 97th,	Chattanooga
Tommie Brown	Democratic	1993-2013	98th, 99th, 100th, 101st, 102nd, 103rd, 104th, 105th, 106th, 107th	Chattanooga
JoAnne Favors	Democratic	2013-2019	108th, 109th, 110th	Chattanooga
Yusuf Hakeem	Democratic	2019–present	111th, 112th, 113th, 114th	Chattanooga

== Recent election results ==
The following are the recent election results for the district. The incumbent representative, Hakeem, has run unopposed in both primaries and general elections since 2020.

=== 2022 ===
2022 Tennessee House of Representatives 28th district election
Party	Candidate	Votes	%
Democratic	Yusuf Hakeem	10,517	100%
Total votes		10,517	100%
Democratic hold			
