= Yusuf Hakeem =

American politician (born 1948)

Member of the Tennessee House of Representatives from the 28th district
- Incumbent
- Assumed office January 8, 2019
- Preceded by: Joanne Favors

Personal details
- Born: December 5, 1948 (age 77) Chattanooga, Tennessee, U.S.
- Party: Democratic
- Spouse: Baseemah Hakeem
- Children: 4
- Education: Chattanooga State Community College (AAS); University of Tennessee at Chattanooga (attended)
- Website: House website

Yusuf Hakeem (born December 5, 1948) is an American politician. A member of the Democratic Party, he serves in the Tennessee House of Representatives and is a former member of the Tennessee Board of Probation and Parole.

== Early life ==
Hakeem was born December 5, 1948. He graduated from Howard High School in Chattanooga, Tennessee in 1966. He then graduated from Chattanooga State Community College, where he majored in electronics, and attended University of Tennessee at Chattanooga where he majored in economics. He married Baseemah, and they have four children. He is a member and deacon of Second Missionary Baptist Church in Chattanooga.

== Career ==
He served on the Hamilton County School Board from 1981 to 1990. He is a retiree from General Electric Corporation and served as a member of the State of Tennessee Board of Probation and Parole from 2006 to 2013.

Hakeem served on the Chattanooga City Council for District 9 from 1990 to 2006, and again from 2013 to 2017 where he founded the Chattanooga Youth Council, now called the Mayor's Youth Council. Sixteen area schools participate in this outreach program.

=== Community involvement ===
- Chairman, Bessie Smith Cultural Center, 2016–
- Chattanooga NAACP Life Member and Board Member
- Board Member, Chattanooga/Hamilton County Railroad Authority
- Chairman, Chattanooga-Hamilton County North Georgia Transportation Planning Organization
- Former Board member of the Challenger Space Center Chattanooga (NASA)
- Former Board member of the Chattanooga Community Impact Fund
- Former Board member of the Fortwood Center

=== Politics ===
In 2018, he ran for the Tennessee House of Representatives District 28. He was endorsed by the retiring representative JoAnne Favors, who said, "Yusuf Hakeem is the right person for the job... He has years of experience in public service, and would not face a learning curve as a first time elected official. He is prepared for the work now" in a public release. He won the contested Democratic primary on August 2, 2018, and won the office on November 6, 2018, defeating Lemon Williams, Jr.

== Positions ==
=== Gun Rights ===
In 2017, the NRA Political Victory Fund rated Hakeem 13% on his position on gun control and gun rights. In 2019, he voted "no" on HB 1264/SB 0705, which created an "enhanced" conceal carry permit.

=== Healthcare ===
Hakeem supports expanding public healthcare, lowering prescription drug costs, and increasing funding for primary care and community health centers. He is for increased women's health funding, specifically preventative care and contraception. He voted "nay" on HB 77, which would prohibit abortions after a fetal heartbeat is detectable. He voted "nay" on HB 1280, to amend state Medicaid funding.

=== Education ===
Hakeem supports full funding of the Basic Education Program. He stated, "It’s something I’ve been interested in for many years, and hopefully, our county can take advantage and have some assistance out of that. Because I think it is something that’s been overdue." He said that he wants to fix Tennessee's "broken testing system," giving more control to teachers.

=== Criminal Justice Reform ===
Hakeem is for reducing recidivism, abolition of mass incarceration, and "alternatives to incarceration, crisis intervention, and officer safety and wellness."

=== Affordability and Poverty Alleviation ===
Hakeem's website states, "Nearly 40 percent of the District 28 will experience a year of poverty at some point during their lives. Communities of color face disproportionate economic challenges and barriers to opportunity. Hakeem will fight for a state and local economy that works for everyone, not just those at the top-ensuring that those who work hard do not have to live in or raise their kids in poverty."

=== Families ===
Hakeem voted "nay" on HB 836, which would allow religious discrimination towards potential adoptive parents. He voted "nay" on HB 1151, to expand the offence of public indecency to public bathrooms, locker rooms, dressing rooms, or showers for multi occupancy single sex use.
