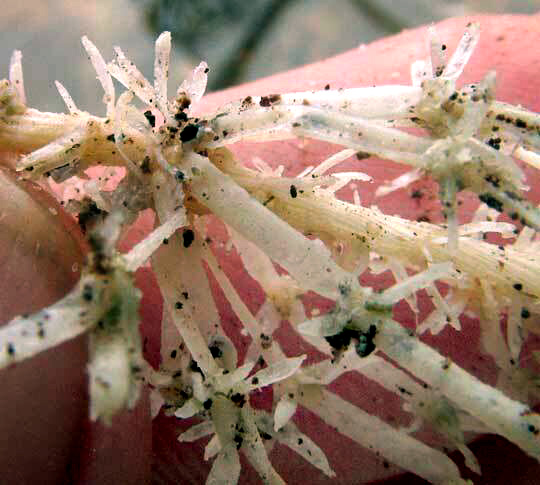
- Chara hornemannii, bleached by drying

Scientific classification
- Kingdom: Plantae
- Division: Charophyta
- Class: Charophyceae
- Order: Charales
- Family: Characeae
- Genus: Chara
- Species: C. hornemannii

Binomial name
- Chara hornemannii Wallman 1853

Synonyms
- Lamprothamnium hornemannii (Wallman) F.K.Daily (1967)

= Chara hornemannii =

Species of freshwater green algae

Chara hornemannii is a species of charophyte, a green algae in the family Characeae.

== Description ==
Typical of other members of the genus Chara, this alga is multicellular. As an alga, not a flowering plant, it produces no flowers. It inhabits freshwater, where it is attached to the muddy bottom, and its parts do not extend above the water. Its stems produce numerous whorled branches. Submerged, it is gray-green, but when removed from water, as when its ponds dries up, within just a few hours the sunlight may bleach it white. To the touch it is somewhat stiff and grainy, or even crunchy, because of mineral deposits covering its body.

Shoots of taxa in the Characeae Family such as Chara species generally average 15–30 cm in length, (~6-12 inches). In that context, Chara hornemannii is considered a large species; specimens collected from Rodrigo de Freitas Lagoon, in the city of Rio de Janeiro, Brazil grew up to ~2 meters in length (~6.6 feet).

== Distribution ==
The GBIF map of georeferenced records of the occurrence of Chara hornemannii shows it presence in the Americas from southern Canada to southern Brazil.

== Ecology ==
Chara species in general dominate in aquatic environments at lower nutrient concentrations. Their influence on sedimentation, the return of sediment which has precipitated out of the water, and the presence of water column nutrients is assumed to be higher than the influence of most flowering plant species.

Chara hornemannii appears able to survive in somewhat brackish water with low levels of salinity, but its presence declines as salt levels increase.

American Coots feed on Chara hornemannii.

== Taxonomy ==
In 1853, the species Chara hornemannii was first published formally by Swedish botanist Johan Haqvin Wallman in the book Försök till en systematisk uppställning af växtfamiljen Characeae, In Stockholm, Sweden. The type specimen described in the work was collected in the West Indies, and preserved in "Hornemann's Herbarium."

There is an accepted variety, Chara hornemannii var. nordhoffiae T.F.Allen (1900), occurring in the U.S. state of California. Sometimes this variety is referenced by these two homotypic synonyms:

- Chara nordhoffiae (T.F.Allen) C.B.Robinson (1906)
- Chara hornemannii f. nordhoffiae (T.F.Allen) R.D.Wood (1962)

== Etymology ==
The origin of the genus name Chara is unknown, though several theories are proposed.

The species name hornemannii commemorates the Danish botanist Jens Wilken Hornemann (1770-1841).

== Gallery ==
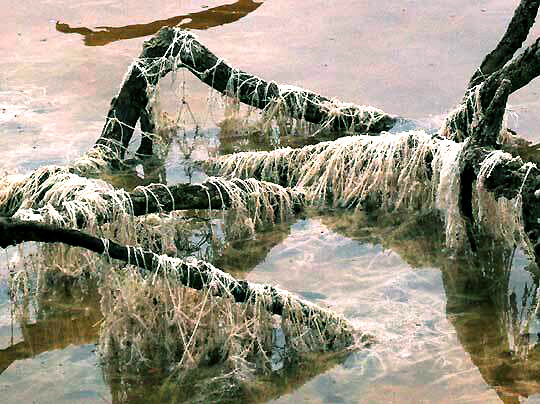
bleached as water in pond subsided

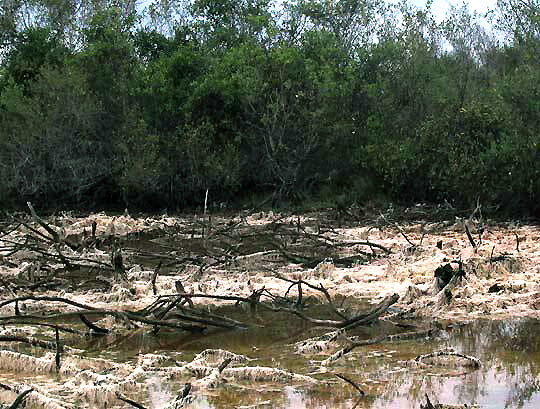
extent of bleaching
