= Tommie Brown =

American politician (1934–2026)

Member of the Tennessee House of Representatives from the 28th district
- In office 1992–2012
- Succeeded by: JoAnne Favors

Personal details
- Born: June 25, 1934 Rome, Georgia, U.S.
- Died: January 20, 2026 (aged 91) Chattanooga, Tennessee, U.S.
- Party: Democratic

Tommie Florence Brown (June 25, 1934 – January 20, 2026) was an American social worker, educator and civic leader who was a member of the Tennessee House of Representatives. She represented Tennessee’s 28th District in the Tennessee House of Representatives, which includes the city of Chattanooga. She served seven terms in the Tennessee General Assembly from 1992 to 2012 as a member of the Democratic Party. In 2002, the Dr. Tommie F. Brown Academy for Classical Studies, now renamed the Tommie F. Brown International Academy, opened in Hamilton County Tennessee.

== Early life ==
Tommie Florence Brown was born in Rome, Georgia, on June 25, 1934, to Louise Murden Brown and Phillip Brown Sr. Her family moved back to Chattanooga, Tennessee, when she was six months old and, with the exception of her university education, she lived there ever since. She was the first of three children. Her siblings were Phillip Brown Jr. and Mary Louise Brown.

== Education and social work career ==
Brown received her B. A. in Social Work at Dillard University in New Orleans, Louisiana in 1957. She completed her first year of graduate social work training at Atlanta University in Atlanta, Georgia in 1958, and earned her M.S.W. from Washington University in St. Louis in 1964 . She obtained her Third Year Certificate from Columbia University in New York, New York in 1975. Brown received her Doctorate of Social Welfare Degree from Columbia University after completing her dissertation in 1984.

Her dissertation, The Struggle to Control Black Leadership: A Study in Community Power, sampled and interviewed respondents involved in Black community leadership in Chattanooga, Tennessee in the 1970s. Brown posited that there was a bifurcated leadership structure in the city as a result of both white and Black communities trying to control Black community initiatives; she also hypothesized that these two leadership initiatives took different positions on social issues due to their different constituencies.

Brown spent almost 15 years as a social worker for the Tennessee Department of Public Welfare and received the National Social Worker of the Year Award in 1970. In 1971, she became the first Black tenure-track faculty member employed by the University of Tennessee at Chattanooga (UTC). Dr. Brown began working at the university as an Assistant Professor in the Sociology Department. Brown created and became coordinator of UTC’s Social Work program in 1977 before establishing the Department of Social Work in 1980. Brown was Head of the Department of Social Work from 1980 to 1983. After serving as both District Representative and Professor from 1993 to 1998, Brown retired from her position at the university to focus on her legislative duties.

== Community engagement and civic leadership ==
Even before participating in the Tennessee Legislature, Brown was a civic leader. Early in her career as a social worker in the late 1950s, Dr. Brown became active in the Chattanooga chapter of the National Association for the Advancement of Colored People (NAACP). When students from Howard High School conducted sit-ins at lunch counters in Chattanooga in 1960, Dr. Brown ran interference behind the scenes. She, along with other social workers in the Tennessee Department of Public Welfare, worked to find ways to protect the students performing the sit-ins in case they were arrested.

In 1970, Brown served as a member of the Chattanooga Model City Program’s District VII Community Development Administration (CDA) board. The Model Cities Program was an urban renewal project focused on improving what they referred to as a “Model Neighborhood Area (MNA).” This area was a 2.4 square mile section of Chattanooga’s inner city that was determined to have a lower standard of living compared to the rest of the city. Program coordinators concluded that the neighborhood area needed improvements in seven main areas: employment and economic development, health and social services, education, housing and relocation, recreation and culture, transportation, physical environment, and crime and juvenile delinquency. As part of the District VII CDA board, Brown participated in meetings with community members and supervised task forces dedicated to developing urban renewal projects.

Brown put a unified and cohesive black leadership system into action by establishing the Tennessee Black Leadership Roundtable. In September of 1984, Dr. Brown submitted a proposal for a statewide Black leadership network to the Tennessee Legislative Black Caucus. The entity formed from this proposal eventually evolved to be the Tennessee Black Leadership Roundtable, a multi-tiered organization focused on linking Black leaders across the state with each other so they could more effectively work to improve the quality of life for Black Tennesseans. The Black Leadership Roundtable hosted meeting summits to discuss which issues they wanted to focus on resolving and organized outreach to citizens and state legislators alike. They tackled issues such as voting rights, equity in college admissions, public health and education, and drug crises.

In 1987, Brown was the lead plaintiff of twelve Chattanooga residents who successfully filed suit against the Chattanooga Board of Commissioners for discriminatory voting practices. The at-large voting system that existed prior to the Brown v. Board of Commissioners of the City of Chattanooga lawsuit was a remnant of the Jim Crow era that made it almost impossible for a minority candidate to win a seat on the Board. On August 8, 1989 a federal judge ruled the city’s voting procedure was illegal under the Voting Rights Act of 1965; a new mayor-council system, which established geographical voting districts within the city that did not dilute minority votes, was implemented in Chattanooga by 1991.

She was also a founding incorporator and director of the 28th District of Tennessee Community Development Corporation (CDC). This corporation, established in 1993, aimed to provide stability to community organizations within Tennessee’s 28th District, which often lacked the facilities and infrastructure needed to be effective in their goals. The 28th District CDC existed to offer this stability by providing organizational and administrative support. This primarily focused on assisting in the distribution of organizations’ literature through access to desktop publishing programs and reduced rates for copying and mailing services. Other services included: providing a meeting space, maintaining a community calendar, and hosting professional service seminars and community organization trainings.

== Legislative career ==
Brown began her twenty-year legislative career in 1992. She served for seven terms, beginning in the 98th Tennessee General Assembly and concluding after the 107th. She is one of the only sixteen Black women to ever serve in the Tennessee State Legislature and the first Black woman to represent the 28th District in the Tennessee House of Representatives.

Over the course of her legislative career, she participated in the Calendar & Rules; Commerce; Children & Family; Conservation & Environment; Education; Finance, Ways & Means; and State & Local Government House standing committees. Although she served on all of the aforementioned standing committees, she was most consistently involved in the Children & Family; Education; and Finance, Ways & Means committees. In addition to these standing committees, Representative Brown served on special committees that spanned across multiple terms of the General Assembly. Notable Special committees on which she served include the Inner City Economic Development Committee, the Ritalin Study Committee, the Lottery Scholarship Committee, and the Diabetes Prevention Study Committee.

She sponsored legislation on a variety of topics, including education, health, racial discrimination, children’s rights, and voting rights. Among other accomplishments in the General Assembly, Dr. Brown proposed the legislature that would finally have Tennessee ratify the 15th Amendment to the U.S. Constitution. Brown also hosted yearly Day on the Hill events to teach students about Tennessee’s legislative processes.

== Death ==
Brown died on January 20, 2026, at the age of 91.
