= JoAnne Favors =

American politician (born 1942)

Joanne Favors

Member of the Tennessee House of Representatives
- In office January 11, 2005 – January 8, 2019
- Preceded by: Brenda Turner
- Succeeded by: Yusuf Hakeem
- Constituency: 29th district (2005-2013); 28th district (2013-2019)

Personal details
- Born: August 27, 1942 (age 83)
- Party: Democratic
- Spouse: Widowed
- Children: 4
- Website: House website

JoAnne Favors (born August 27, 1942) is an American politician and a Democratic member of the Tennessee House of Representatives for the 28th district, which is composed of part of Hamilton County. She has served as a state representative since she was first elected in November 2004. From 1998 to 2005, she had been a member of the Hamilton County Commission. She is the Secretary of the House Health and Human Resources Committee. She is a member of the Children and Family Affairs Committee, the Commerce Committee, the Health and Human Resources Committee, the Domestic Relations Subcommittee, the Small Business Subcommittee, the Professional Occupations Subcommittee, and the Public Health and Family Assistance Subcommittee.

JoAnne Favors works in health administration, as a consultant, and as a motivational speaker. She possesses a Master of Science degree in Nursing Administration and Adult Health, a Bachelor of Science degree in nursing, and an associate's degree in nursing.

Favors was re-elected in the November 2010 election. She faced no Republican opposition.
