= Clarence B. Robinson =

American politician and educator

Member of the Tennessee House of Representatives from the 28th district
- In office January 14, 1975 – January 12, 1993
- Preceded by: Tommie Brown

Personal details
- Born: February 4, 1911
- Died: January 7, 2002 (aged 90)
- Party: Democratic

Clarence B. Robinson (February 4, 1911–January 7, 2002) was an American educator and politician who represented the 28th district of the Tennessee House of Representatives from 1975 to 1993. He was a founder of the Black Caucus in the Tennessee General Assembly. He was the first African American to be elected to the Tennessee legislature since Reconstruction. The C.B. Robinson Bridge (1981) over the Tennessee River in Chattanooga was named after him.

Robinson was succeeded in the state legislature by Tommie Brown.
