= Polynucleobacter sphagniphilus =

Scientific classification
- Domain: Bacteria
- Kingdom: Pseudomonadati
- Phylum: Pseudomonadota
- Class: Betaproteobacteria
- Order: Burkholderiales
- Family: Burkholderiaceae
- Genus: Polynucleobacter
- Species: P. sphagniphilus

Binomial name
- Polynucleobacter sphagniphilus Hahn et al. 2017

Type strain
- MWH-Weng1-1 =DSM 24018 =CIP 111099

Synonyms
- Polynucleobacter necessarius subsp. asymbioticus MWH-Weng1-1, Polynucleobacter sp. MWH-Weng1-1, strain MWH-Weng1-1

Species of bacterium

Polynucleobacter sphagniphilus is an aerobic, chemo-organotrophic, non-motile, free-living bacterium of the genus Polynucleobacter.

The type strain was isolated from a small acidic bog pond located in Austria. In contrast to other Polynucleobacter type strains, for instance the type strain of P. duraquae, the strain inhabits and prefers acidic waters. The genome sequence of the strain was fully determined., The type strain dwells as a free-living, planktonic bacterium in the water column of a bog pond, thus is part of freshwater bacterioplankton.
