= Polynucleobacter victoriensis =

Scientific classification
- Domain: Bacteria
- Kingdom: Pseudomonadati
- Phylum: Pseudomonadota
- Class: Betaproteobacteria
- Order: Burkholderiales
- Family: Burkholderiaceae
- Genus: Polynucleobacter
- Species: P. victoriensis

Binomial name
- Polynucleobacter victoriensis Hahn et al. 2017

Type strain
- MWH-VicM1 =DSM 21486 =JCM 32005

Synonyms
- Polynucleobacter cosmopolitanus MWH-VicM1, Polynucleobacter sp. MWH-VicM1, strain MWH-VicM1

Species of bacterium

Polynucleobacter victoriensis is an aerobic, chemo-organotrophic, non-motile, free-living bacterium of the genus Polynucleobacter.

The type strain was isolated from Lake Victoria near Kampala in Uganda, East Africa. This strain was previously included in the description of P. cosmopolitanus, however subsequent sequencing and comparative analysis of the genome, of strain MWH-VicM1 revealed that this strain represented a new species, which was subsequently described as P. victoriensis. The species name reflects the origin of the type strain of the species from Lake Victoria. Strain MWH-VicM1 is remarkable due to its small genome size of only 1.6 Mbp. The type strain dwells as a free-living, planktonic bacterium in the water column of the lake, thus is part of freshwater bacterioplankton.
