= Polynucleobacter hirudinilacicola =

Scientific classification
- Domain: Bacteria
- Kingdom: Pseudomonadati
- Phylum: Pseudomonadota
- Class: Betaproteobacteria
- Order: Burkholderiales
- Family: Burkholderiaceae
- Genus: Polynucleobacter
- Species: P. hirudinilacicola

Binomial name
- Polynucleobacter hirudinilacicola Hahn et al. 2018

Type strain
- MWH-EgelM1-30-B4 =DSM 23911 =LMG 30144

Synonyms
- Polynucleobacter necessarius subsp. asymbioticus MWH-EgelM1-30-B4, Polynucleobacter sp. MWH-EgelM1-30-B4, strain MWH-EgelM1-30-B4

Species of bacterium

Polynucleobacter hirudinilacicola is an aerobic, chemo-organotrophic, non-motile, free-living bacterium of the genus Polynucleobacter.

The type strain was isolated from a small alkaline lake located in Austria. The genome sequence of the strain was fully determined. The type strain dwells as a free-living, planktonic bacterium in the water column of the lake, thus is part of freshwater bacterioplankton. Among the described Polynucleobacter species, P. hirudinilacicola is closest related to P. campilacus.
