= Polynucleobacter wuianus =

Scientific classification
- Domain: Bacteria
- Kingdom: Pseudomonadati
- Phylum: Pseudomonadota
- Class: Betaproteobacteria
- Order: Burkholderiales
- Family: Burkholderiaceae
- Genus: Polynucleobacter
- Species: P. wuianus

Binomial name
- Polynucleobacter wuianus Hahn et al. 2017

Type strain
- QLW-P1FAT50C-4

Synonyms
- P. necessarius subsp. asymbioticus, Polynucleobacter sp. QLW-P1FAT50C-4

Species of bacterium

Polynucleobacter wuianus is an aerobic, chemo-organotrophic, catalase- and oxidase-positive, free-living bacterium of the genus Polynucleobacter, isolated from a small pond located in the Austrian Alps in the area of Salzburg. Bacteria affiliated with this species represent planktonic bacteria (bacterioplankton) dwelling in acidic freshwater systems. The species was named after the Chinese limnologist and microbiologist Qinglong L. Wu (Chinese Academy of Sciences) who isolated the type strain.
