= Polynucleobacter paneuropaeus =

Scientific classification
- Domain: Bacteria
- Kingdom: Pseudomonadati
- Phylum: Pseudomonadota
- Class: Betaproteobacteria
- Order: Burkholderiales
- Family: Burkholderiaceae
- Genus: Polynucleobacter
- Species: P. paneuropaeus

Binomial name
- Polynucleobacter paneuropaeus Hoetzinger et al. 2017

Type strain
- MG-25-Pas1-D2 =DSM 103454 =CIP 111323

Synonyms
- Polynucleobacter necessarius subsp. asymbioticus MG-25-Pas1-D2, Polynucleobacter sp. MG-25-Pas1-D2, strain MG-25-Pas1-D2

Species of bacterium

Polynucleobacter paneuropaeus is an aerobic, facultatively anaerobic, chemo-organotrophic, non-motile, free-living bacterium of the genus Polynucleobacter.

The type strain was isolated from a small acidic lake located in Norway. Other strains representing this species were isolated from acidic or circum-neutral lakes and ponds located in Finland, Germany, The Czech Republic, Austria and France. The northernmost observation of this species was reported for the Pasvikdalen valley in the Finnmark, Norway near Kirkenes at a latitude of about 69°N, while the southernmost known occurrence was reported for Lake Creno (Lac de Creno) at the Mediterranean island Corsica, France near the village Soccia at a latitude of about 42°N. The type strain dwells as a free-living, planktonic bacterium in the water column of the lake, thus is part of freshwater bacterioplankton.
