= Polynucleobacter sinensis =

Polynucleobacter duraquae

Scientific classification
- Domain: Bacteria
- Kingdom: Pseudomonadati
- Phylum: Pseudomonadota
- Class: Betaproteobacteria
- Order: Burkholderiales
- Family: Burkholderiaceae
- Genus: Polynucleobacter
- Species: P. siensis

Binomial name
- Polynucleobacter siensis Hahn et al. 2016

Type strain
- MWH-HuW1

Synonyms
- P. necessarius subsp. asymbioticus, Polynucleobacter sp. MWH-HuW1

Species of bacterium

Polynucleobacter sinensis is an aerobic, chemo-organotrophic, catalase- and oxidase-positive, free-living bacterium of the genus Polynucleobacter, isolated from a freshwater pond in China. The species represents planktonic bacteria (bacterioplankton) dwelling in non-acidic freshwater systems. The species name refers to the origin of the type strain from China.
