= Polynucleobacter aenigmaticus =

Scientific classification
- Domain: Bacteria
- Kingdom: Pseudomonadati
- Phylum: Pseudomonadota
- Class: Betaproteobacteria
- Order: Burkholderiales
- Family: Burkholderiaceae
- Genus: Polynucleobacter
- Species: P. aenigmaticus

Binomial name
- Polynucleobacter aenigmaticus Hahn et al. 2017

Type strain
- MWH-K35W1 =DSM 24006 =LMG 29706

Synonyms
- Polynucleobacter necessarius subsp. asymbioticus MWH-K35W1, Polynucleobacter sp. MWH-K35W1, strain MWH-K35W1

Species of bacterium

Polynucleobacter aenigmaticus is an aerobic, facultatively anaerobic, chemo-organotrophic, non-motile, free-living bacterium of the genus Polynucleobacter.

The type strain was isolated from a small alkaline lake located in Austria. This strain differers from other Polynucleobacter type strains due to its origin from a deep anoxic water layer. The genome sequence of the strain was fully determined., The type strain dwells as a free-living, planktonic bacterium in the water column of the lake, thus is part of freshwater bacterioplankton.
