= Polynucleobacter asymbioticus =

Scientific classification
- Domain: Bacteria
- Kingdom: Pseudomonadati
- Phylum: Pseudomonadota
- Class: Betaproteobacteria
- Order: Burkholderiales
- Family: Burkholderiaceae
- Genus: Polynucleobacter
- Species: P. asymbioticus

Binomial name
- Polynucleobacter asymbioticus Hahn et al. 2016

Type strain
- QLW-P1DMWA-1, DSM 18221, CIP 109841

Synonyms
- Polynucleobacter necessarius subsp. asymbioticus, Polynucleobacter sp. QLW-P1DMWA-1, strain QLW-P1DMWA-1

Species of bacterium

Polynucleobacter asymbioticus is an aerobic, catalase- and oxidase-positive, chemo-organotrophic, nonmotile, free-living bacterium of the genus Polynucleobacter. The type strain was isolated from a small pond located in the Austrian Alps in the area of Salzburg and described as a new subspecies of Polynucleobacter necessarius in 2009. The classification of the type strain was hampered by the fact that its closest described relative represented obligate endosymbionts, i.e. P. necessarius, not available as a pure culture suitable for standard tests (DNA-DNA hybridization experiments) for delineation of prokaryotic species. Therefore, the strain was preliminarily placed in the subspecies P. necessarius subsp. asymbioticus. Later sequencing of the genome of the type strain revealed that the strain represented a novel species within the genus Polynucleobacter. Therefore, its taxonomic rank was lifted from the subspecies to the species level. Strains of P. asymbioticus dwell as planktonic organisms in acidic, humic-rich freshwater systems. Comparative genome analyses revealed that P. asymbioticus represents an atypical member of the family Burkholderiaceae regarding its small genome size and its passive lifestyle. A recent study used a collection of 37 P. asymbioticus strains isolated from various ponds located in a larger region of the Austrian Alps to gain insights in the evolution of Polynucleobacter bacteria.
