= Polynucleobacter yangtzensis =

Scientific classification
- Domain: Bacteria
- Kingdom: Pseudomonadati
- Phylum: Pseudomonadota
- Class: Betaproteobacteria
- Order: Burkholderiales
- Family: Burkholderiaceae
- Genus: Polynucleobacter
- Species: P. yangtzensis

Binomial name
- Polynucleobacter yangtzensis Hahn et al. 2016

Type strain
- MWH-JaK3

Synonyms
- P. necessarius subsp. asymbioticus, Polynucleobacter sp. MWH-JaK3

Species of bacterium

Polynucleobacter yangtzensis is an aerobic, chemo-organotrophic, catalase- and oxidase-positive, sometimes motile, free-living bacterium of the genus Polynucleobacter, isolated from Yangtze River in the City of Nanjing (China). The species represents planktonic bacteria (bacterioplankton) dwelling in alkaline freshwater systems. The species name refers to the origin of the type strain.
