= Fornacher Redlbach =

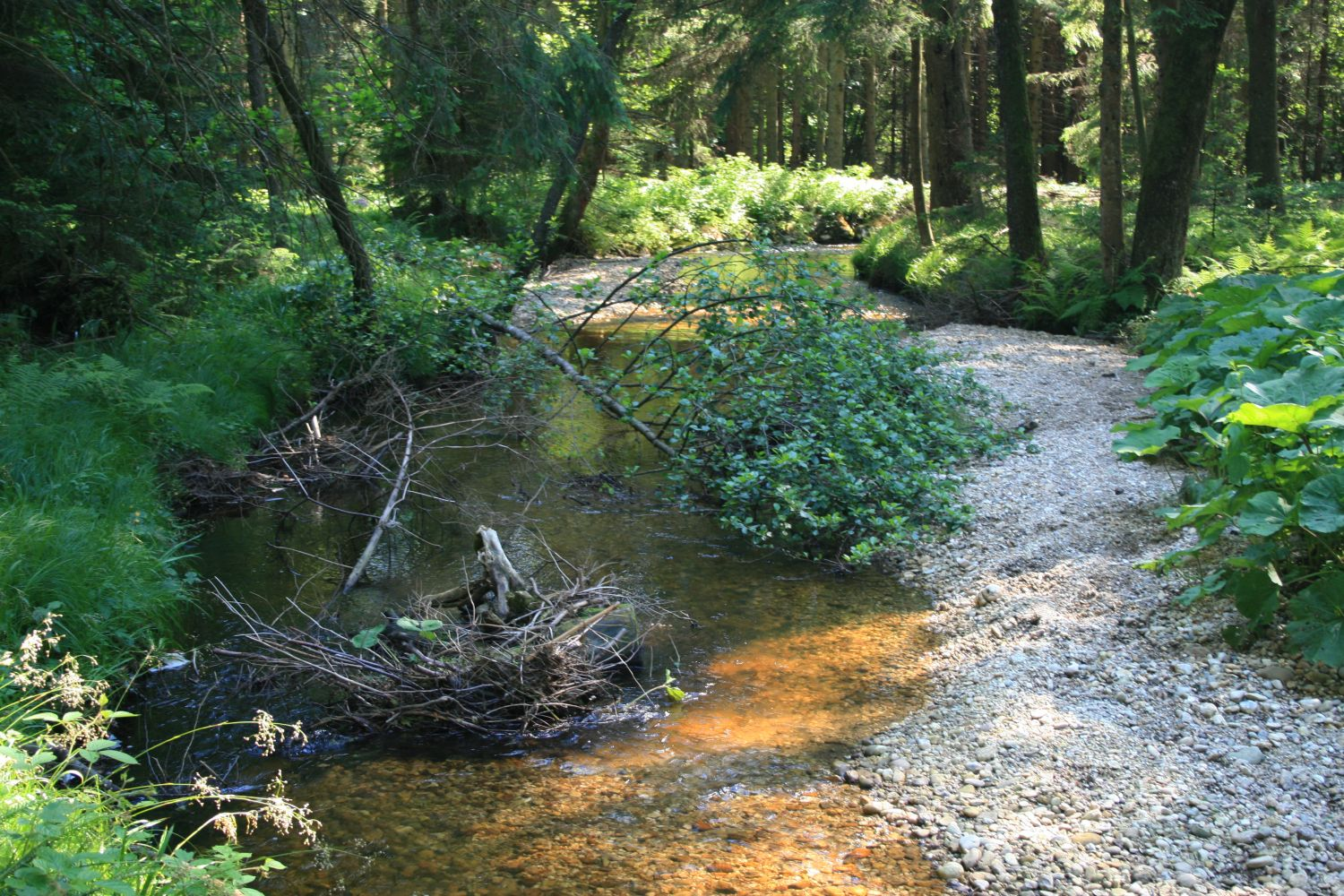
- Redlbach South of Forsthaus Redltal

Location
- Country: Austria
- State: Upper Austria

Physical characteristics
- Source
  - location: Upper Austria
- Mouth
  - location: West of Vöcklamarkt into the Vöckla
  - coordinates: 48.0001°N 13.4688°E
- Length: 13.8 km (8.6 mi)

Basin features
- Progression: Vöckla→ Ager→ Traun→ Danube→ Black Sea

The Fornacher Redlbach is a river of Upper Austria.

The Fornacher Redlbach has a length of approximately 14 kilometres (8.7 mi) and a width of about 5 metres (16 ft). West of Vöcklamarkt it joins the Vöckla, which itself joins the Ager. The river is partly untreated, partly modulated with backwater area. Thanks to its excellent water quality it is rich in trout.
