= Polynucleobacter rarus =

Scientific classification
- Domain: Bacteria
- Kingdom: Pseudomonadati
- Phylum: Pseudomonadota
- Class: Betaproteobacteria
- Order: Burkholderiales
- Family: Burkholderiaceae
- Genus: Polynucleobacter
- Species: P. rarus

Binomial name
- Polynucleobacter rarus Hahn et al. 2011

Type strain
- CIP 109928, DSM 21648, MT-CBb6A5

Species of prokaryote

Polynucleobacter rarus is an aerobic, chemo-organotrophic, catalase- and oxidase-positive, nonmotile bacterium of the genus Polynucleobacter, isolated from an acidic lake in Wisconsin.
