= Polynucleobacter acidiphobus =

Scientific classification
- Domain: Bacteria
- Kingdom: Pseudomonadati
- Phylum: Pseudomonadota
- Class: Betaproteobacteria
- Order: Burkholderiales
- Family: Burkholderiaceae
- Genus: Polynucleobacter
- Species: P. acidiphobus

Binomial name
- Polynucleobacter acidiphobus Hahn et al. 2011

Type strain
- MWH-PoolGreenA3, CIP 110079, DSM 21994

Species of bacterium

Polynucleobacter acidiphobus is an aerobic, chemo-organotrophic, catalase- and oxidase-positive, nonmotile bacterium of the genus Polynucleobacter. The type strain was isolated from a rock pool which was filled with fresh water in a mountain brook in Corsica in France.
