= Vöckla =

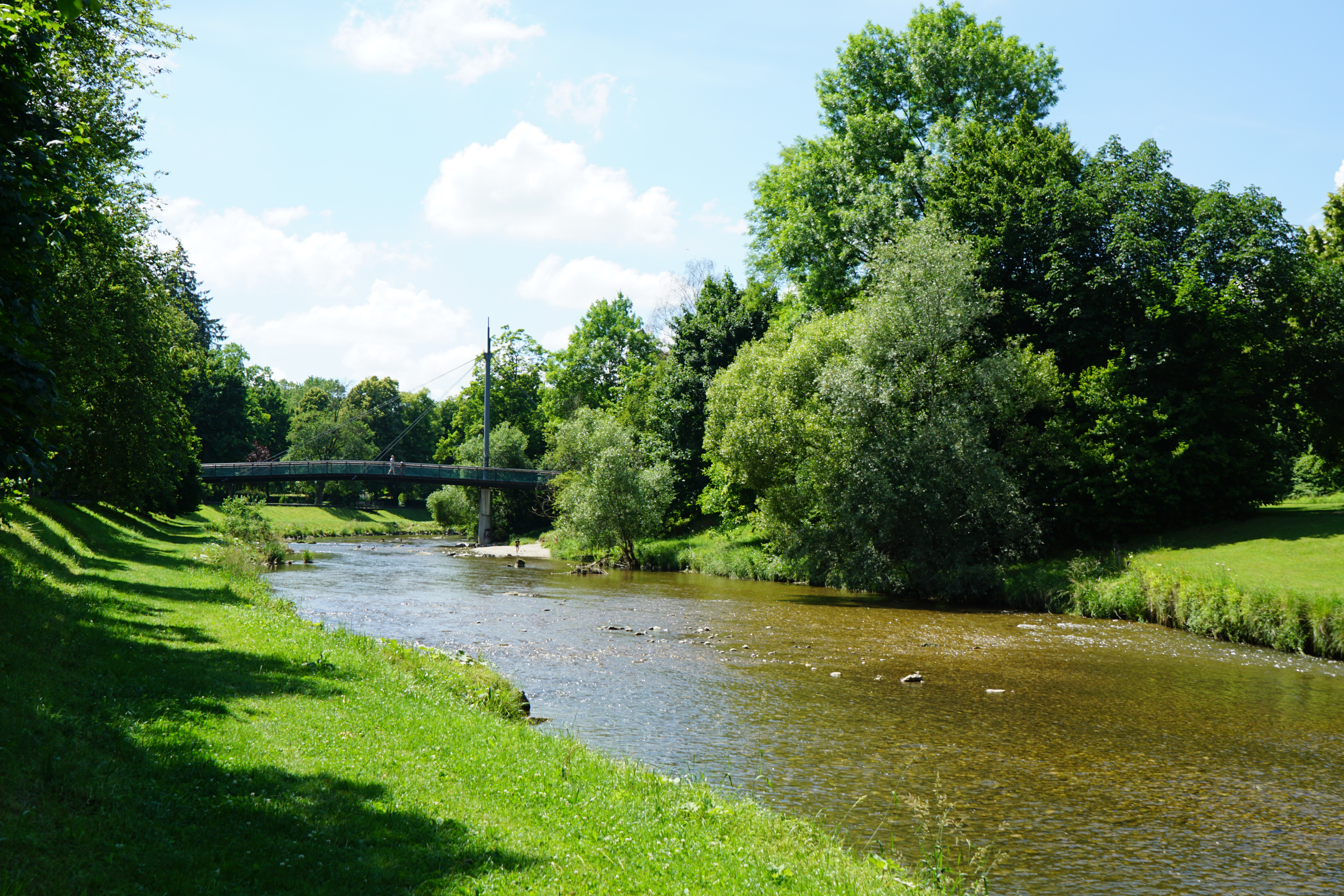
- The Vöckla in Vöcklabruck

Location
- Country: Austria, EU
- State: Upper Austria, Salzburg

Physical characteristics
- Source
  - location: northeast of the Mondsee
  - coordinates: 47.8814°N 13.3641°E
- Mouth
  - location: in Vöcklabruck into the Ager
  - coordinates: 48°00′04″N 13°40′18″E
- Length: 47.2 km (29.3 mi)

Basin features
- Progression: Ager→ Traun→ Danube→ Black Sea

The Vöckla is a river in Upper Austria and Salzburg. It originates at Mondseeberg, north-east of Mondsee, and flows into the Ager near Vöcklabruck after a course of approximately 47 km.

== Course ==
The Vöckla is formed from several headwater streams on the Mondseeberg in the area of the Wildmoos raised bog within the municipal boundaries of Tiefgraben and initially flows northwards. For a stretch of around 2 km, near Angern and Vöcklatal, it forms the state border between Upper Austria and Salzburg, otherwise, it flows entirely within the district of Vöcklabruck. At Frankenmarkt, it changes direction to the east, passing through Vöcklamarkt and Timelkam. At Straß (in the municipality of Timelkam), the Vöckla comes very close to the Ager, the rivers are only around 200 metres apart. However, both rivers change direction by almost 180°, the Vöckla turns northwards, flows through Vöcklabruck and only joins the Ager downstream of Vöcklabruck, in the Schalchhamer Au area. This quasi-island has favoured the development of Vöcklabruck.

=== Tributaries ===
The Vöckla has multiple tributaries, these being the Kirchhamer Bach and the Weinbach which mark the western most extend of the vöckla region coming from Straßwalchen. The largest tributaries among many others are the Fornacher Redlbach shortly before Vöcklamarkt, the Frankenburger Redlbach past Vöcklamarkt as well as the Ampflwanger Bach and the Dürre Ager by Timelkam.

== Catchment area and water flow ==
The catchment area of the Vöckla is 446 km², it makes up more than 35% of the catchment area of the Ager. The highest point is the Mondseeberg with 1029 m.a.A.

The mean discharge at the Vöcklabruck gauge is 8.8 m³/s, which corresponds to a runoff rate of 19.7 l/s·km². The Vöckla exhibits a distinctly winter-pluvial discharge regime at this point. The monthly average for March, the month with the highest discharge, is 13.4 m³/s, more than twice that of October, the month with the lowest discharge, at 6.21 m³/s. The highest recorded flood (August 2002) was 36 times the mean discharge, whilst the lowest known discharge was around one-twentieth of the mean discharge.

== Economic use ==
The Vöckla’s hydropower has been harnessed since the 19th century. There are around 20 hydropower plants along its course, mainly sawmills. In many cases, water from the Vöckla is diverted into a mill stream. The Timelkam steam power station, formerly fuelled by lignite and now converted to a CCGT-powerplant fuel by natural gas, uses cooling water from the Vöckla.

== Environment ==
Today, the natural course and water balance of the Vöckla are significantly affected, particularly by regulation and numerous weirs. The river’s original meandering course is now visible in only a few places. In its upper reaches, in the municipalities of Tiefgraben and Zell am Moos, the Vöckla still flows in a relatively natural state, with riparian woodland dominated by willows and ash trees. Further downstream, there are still isolated near-natural sections with riparian woodland and small floodplain forests, consisting mainly of ash floodplain forests, but also grey alder and willow floodplain forests.

=== Fauna ===
The Vöckla is part of the trout region, the main fish species found here are brown trout, grayling and rainbow trout. In the upper reaches and its tributaries, the stone crayfish is still relatively widespread.

=== Water quality ===
Water quality is affected by intensive agricultural use and industrial and commercial activities within the catchment area. In its upper reaches, the Vöckla is classified as quality class I to II, whilst in its lower reaches it is classified as quality class II. In the past, the use of cooling water by the Timelkam power plant frequently led to excessive warming of the Vöckla during the winter months, thereby causing damage to fish stocks.
