= Polynucleobacter campilacus =

Scientific classification
- Domain: Bacteria
- Kingdom: Pseudomonadati
- Phylum: Pseudomonadota
- Class: Betaproteobacteria
- Order: Burkholderiales
- Family: Burkholderiaceae
- Genus: Polynucleobacter
- Species: P. campilacus

Binomial name
- Polynucleobacter campilacus Hahn et al. 2018

Type strain
- MWH-Feld-100, DSM 24007, LMG 29705

Synonyms
- Polynucleobacter necessarius subsp. asymbioticus, Polynucleobacter sp. MWH-Feld-100

Species of bacterium

Polynucleobacter campilacus is an aerobic, catalase- and oxidase-positive, chemo-organotrophic, nonmotile, free-living bacterium of the genus Polynucleobacter., The type strain was isolated from Lake Feldsee located in the Southern Black Forest in Germany. The species epithet "campilacus" refers to the origin of the type strain from this lake. The complete genome sequence of the strain was determined. Among the described Polynucleobacter species, P. campilacus is closest related to P. hirudinilacicola.
