= Polynucleobacter duraquae =

Scientific classification
- Domain: Bacteria
- Kingdom: Pseudomonadati
- Phylum: Pseudomonadota
- Class: Betaproteobacteria
- Order: Burkholderiales
- Family: Burkholderiaceae
- Genus: Polynucleobacter
- Species: P. duraquae

Binomial name
- Polynucleobacter duraquae Hahn et al. 2016

Type strain
- MWH-MoK4

Synonyms
- P. necessarius subsp. asymbioticus, Polynucleobacter sp. MWH-MoK4

Species of bacterium

Polynucleobacter duraquae is an aerobic, chemo-organotrophic, catalase- and oxidase-positive, sometimes motile, free-living bacterium of the genus Polynucleobacter, isolated from Lake Mondsee in Austria. The species represents planktonic bacteria (bacterioplankton) dwelling in alkaline freshwater systems.
