= Aurach (Ager) =

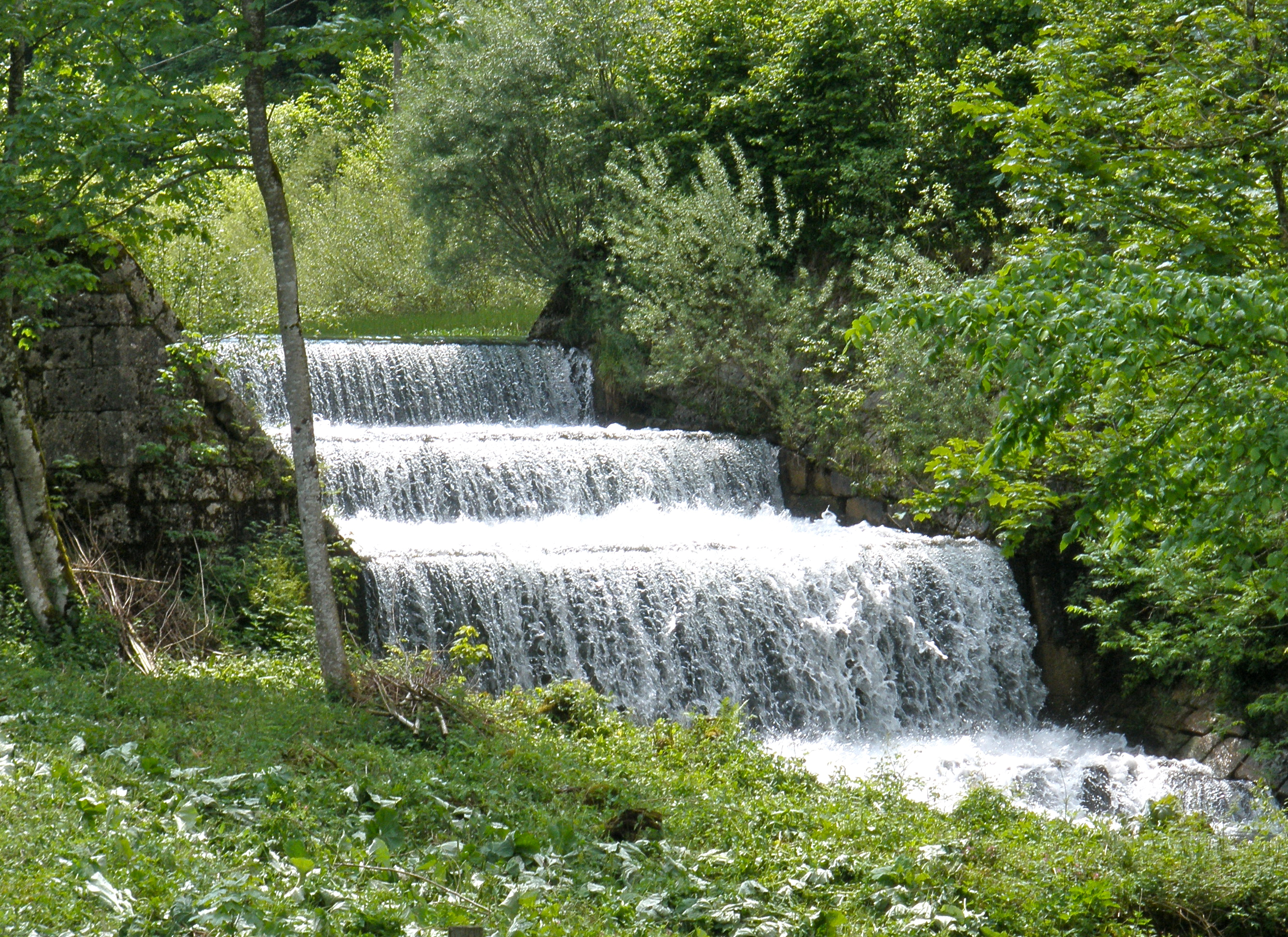

Location
- Country: Austria
- State: Upper Austria

Physical characteristics
- Mouth
  - location: Ager
  - coordinates: 48.0055°N 13.7377°E
- Length: 28.6 km (17.8 mi)

Basin features
- Progression: Ager→ Traun→ Danube→ Black Sea

Aurach (German pronunciation: [ˈaʊʁax]) is a river in the Austrian state of Upper Austria.

It originates in the area of the mountain Hochleckenkogel in the Höllengebirge and flows through the wooden rich Aurach Valley, that spreads through the communities of Altmünster (districts Neukirchen, Reindlmühl, Finsterau) and Pinsdorf (district Kufhaus). After leaving the Aurach Valley the river flows further through the Alpine foothills via Aurachkirchen (district of Ohlsdorf) until Wankham (municipality Regau), where it converges with the river Ager.
