= Polynucleobacter difficilis =

Scientific classification
- Domain: Bacteria
- Kingdom: Pseudomonadati
- Phylum: Pseudomonadota
- Class: Betaproteobacteria
- Order: Burkholderiales
- Family: Burkholderiaceae
- Genus: Polynucleobacter
- Species: P. difficilis

Binomial name
- Polynucleobacter difficilis Hahn et al. 2012

Species of bacterium

Polynucleobacter difficilis is an aerobic, catalase- and oxidase-positive, chemo-organotrophic, nonmotile, freshwater bacterium of the genus Polynucleobacter, isolated from the Lake Sevan from a depth of 60 m in Armenia.
