= Dürre Ager =

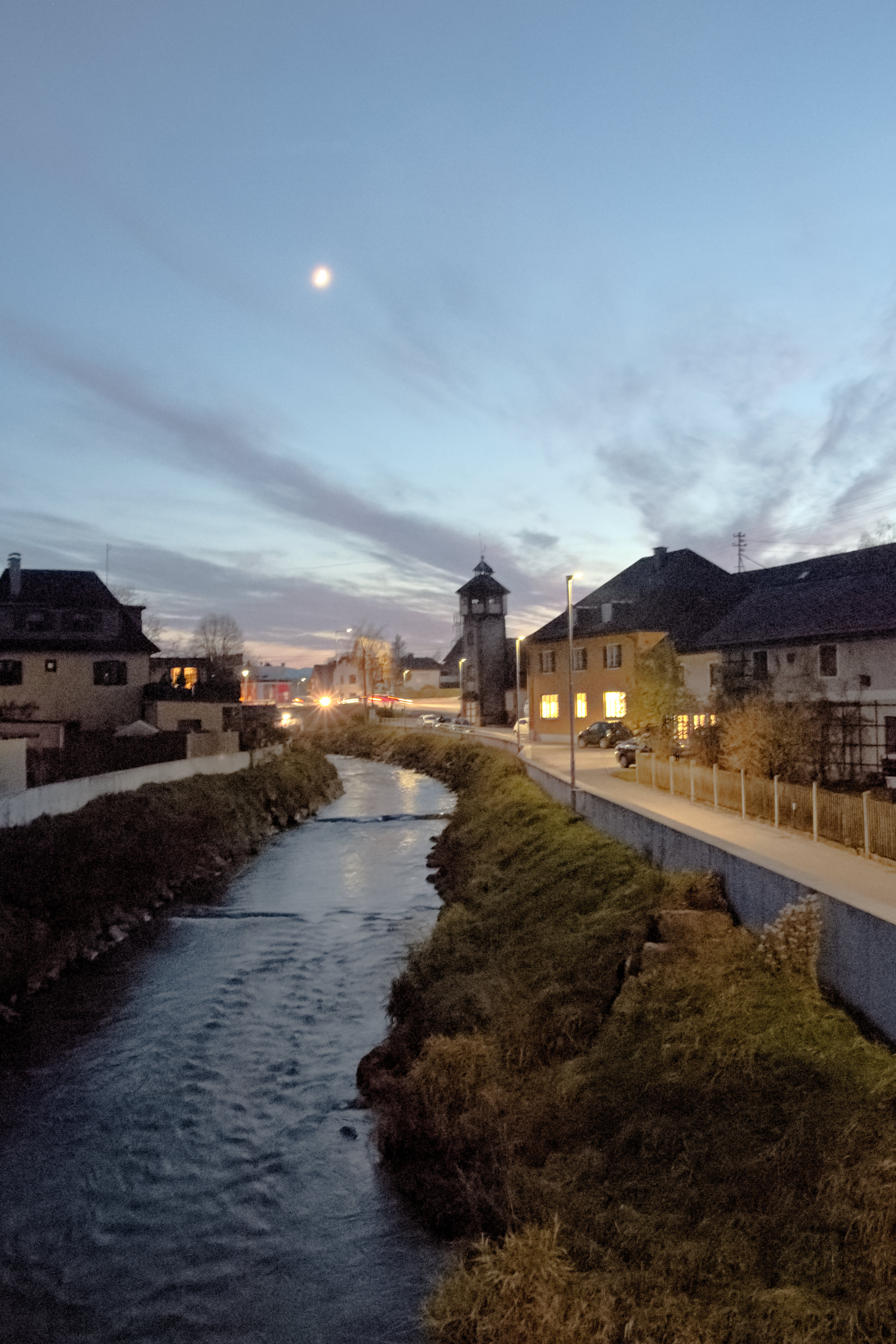
- The Dürre Ager in Timelkam

Location
- Country: Austria
- State: Upper Austria

Physical characteristics
- Source
  - location: Upper Austria
- Mouth
  - location: at Timelkam into the Vöckla
  - coordinates: 48.0047°N 13.6097°E
- Length: 31.3 km (19.4 mi)

Basin features
- Progression: Vöckla→ Ager→ Traun→ Danube→ Black Sea

The Dürre Ager is a river of Upper Austria.

The Dürre Ager flows through the Attergau area from south to north passes through St Georgen im Attergau. It joins the Vöckla at Timelkam. It has a length of approximately 22.5 kilometres (14.0 mi).
