= Ager (river) =

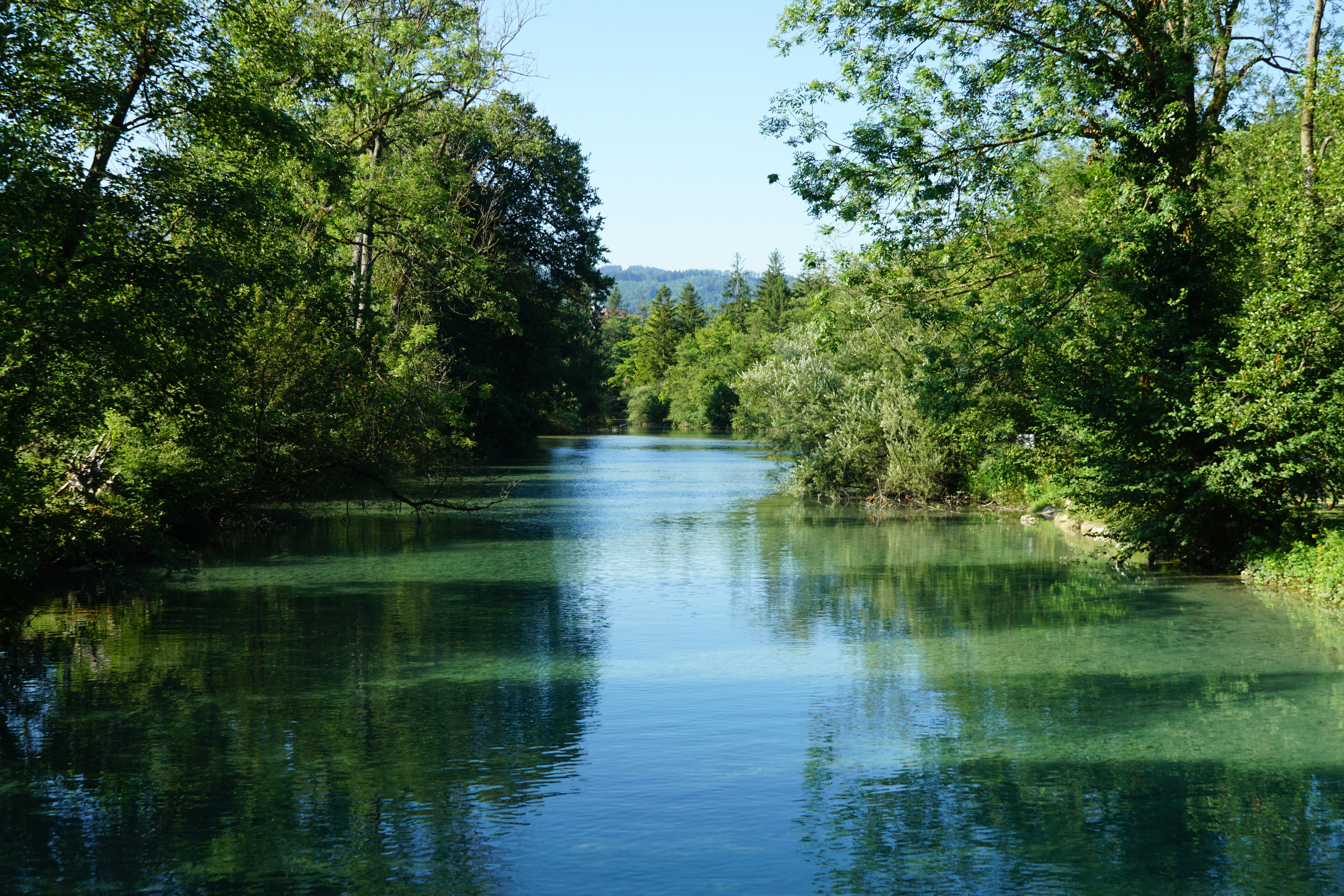
- The Ager in Oberachmann

Location
- Country: Austria, EU

Physical characteristics
- Source
  - location: Attersee
  - coordinates: 47.9489°N 13.5934°E
- Mouth
  - location: Traun
  - coordinates: 48°05′16″N 13°51′32″E
- Length: 33.8 km (21.0 mi)

Basin features
- Progression: Traun→ Danube→ Black Sea

The Ager is a river in Upper Austria. It is the discharge of Lake Attersee and, after a course of around 34 km, flows into the Traun from the left in the north-east, between Lambach and Stadl-Paura. The Ager drains the entire north-western Salzkammergut region. Its catchment area covers around 1,260 km². It flows through the northern Alpine foreland.

== Etymology ==
The name Ager is derived from the Celtic word Agria. The root *ag- means to flow, to lead, which is a reference to the river’s originally strong current.

== Course ==
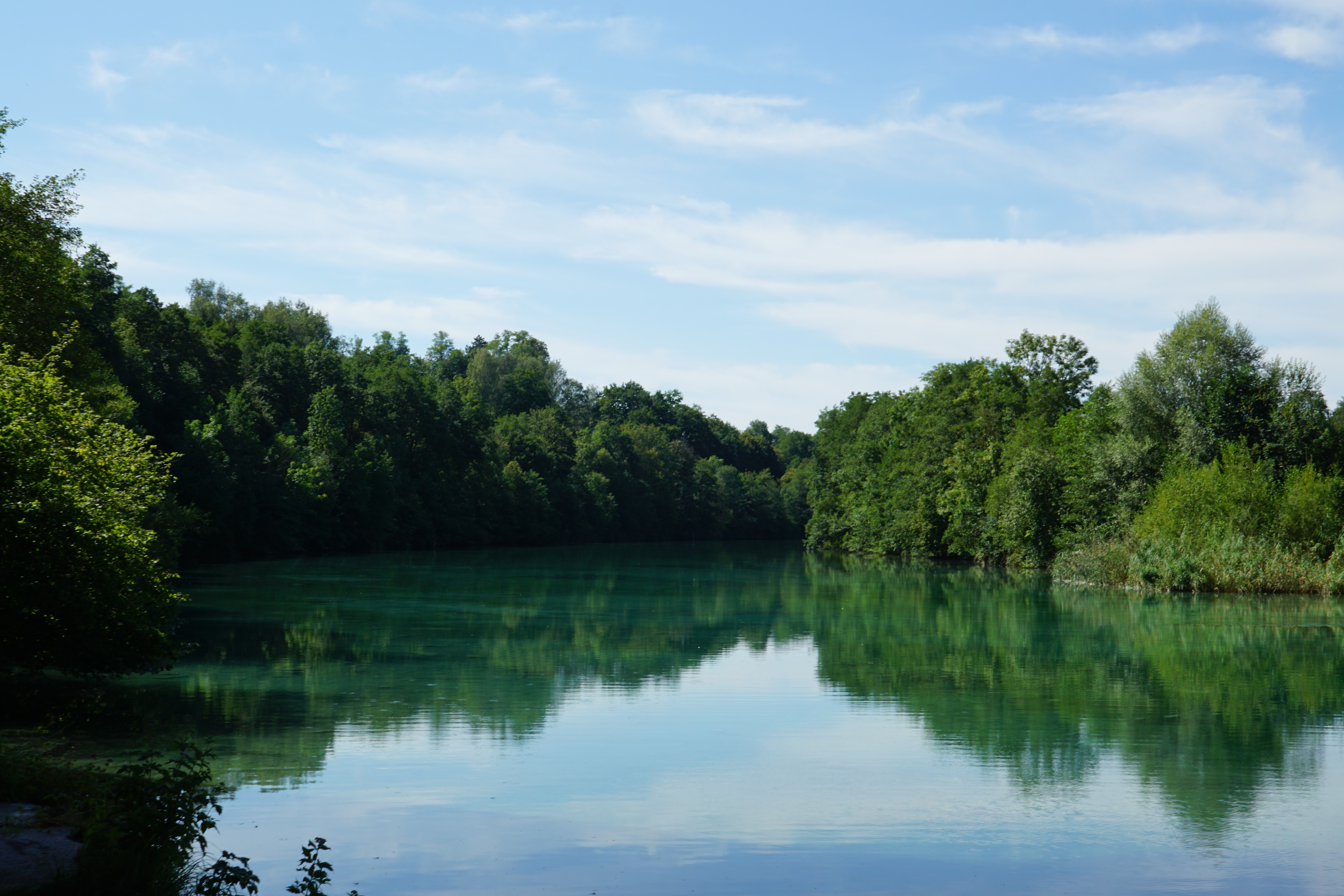
Upper course of the Ager

The Ager flows out of Lake Attersee at its north-eastern end, between Schörfling and Seewalchen, and then flows northwards through Lenzing an der Ager. From Timelkam, it turns eastwards and takes in the Vöckla at Vöcklabruck. It continues north-eastwards, past Regau, Attnang-Puchheim and Schwanenstadt, until it flows into the Traun as the boundary river between the municipalities of Stadl-Paura and Lambach.

=== Tributaries ===
By far the most significant tributary is the Vöckla, which flows into the Ager at Vöcklabruck. It drains more than 35 per cent of the Ager catchment area. Further tributaries, further downstream, include the Dürre Aurach near Preising, the Aurach near Wankham, the Ottnanger Redlbach just before Schwanenstadt and the Staiger Bach near Schwanenstadt. Via Lake Attersee, the Ager also drains Lake Mondsee, Lake Irrsee and Lake Fuschlsee, each of which is connected by relatively short rivers.

=== Geology ===
The Ager was formed at the end of the Würm glaciation, when the massive Eastern Alpine glaciers began to melt. Lake Attersee is a typical glacial terminal lake, as are Lake Mondsee and Lake Irrsee. However, these drain in the opposite direction, towards the south into Lake Attersee, because this transverse breach formed before the lakes could break through to the north, as is also the case with Lake Fuschlsee, which flows through the Thalgau glacial trough, which was formed at the confluence of the Traun Glacier and the Salzach Glacier. The Ager valley itself lies within the Alpine foreland and forms the Vöckla-Agertal valley, which runs eastwards across the foothills of the Alps. This is surrounded by the Ager-Traun terraced landscape, post-glacial river terraces in the foreland molasse, and hence the Vöckla-Ager hilly landscape as a residual landscape. To the south lies the Flysch zone, to the north, the sedimentary mass of the Hausruck.

== Water flow ==
The mean discharge at the Fischerau gauging station is 33.5 m³/s, which corresponds to a runoff rate of 26.7 l/s·km². The Ager has a very balanced flow regime, the mean discharge in March, the month with the highest flow (46.7 m³/s), is only just under twice as high as in October, the month with the lowest flow (24.0 m³/s). Natural discharge patterns are influenced by the weir at the outlet of Lake Attersee, which is designed to delay a fall of the lake level during dry periods and to raise the low-water level of the Ager.

== Economic use ==
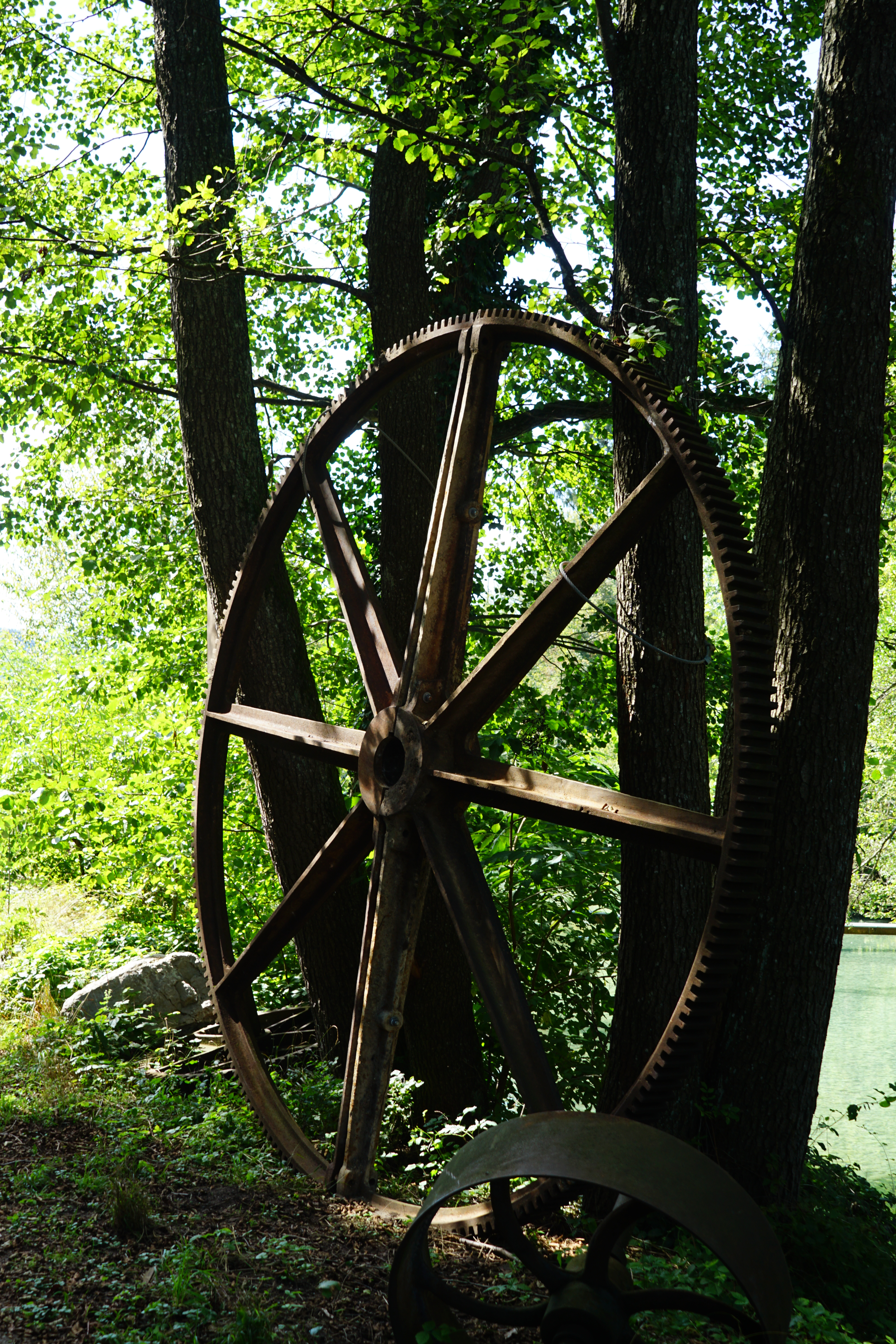
Old cast iron gear wheel from a torn-down mill on display by branch of the Ager

The abundant water flow, which remained fairly constant throughout the year thanks to the buffer provided by Lake Attersee, encouraged the establishment of commercial operations along the river. Consequently, there were ironworks and sawmills, grain mills and paper mills, as well as bark mills. On the upper reaches of the Ager alone, between Seewalchen and Lenzing, there were once seven mills. Subsequently, timber-processing businesses and two paper mills were established within what is now the municipal area of Lenzing an der Ager. Until the beginning of the 20th century, timber rafting on the Ager also played an important role. Timber from the Attergau region was thus transported to the businesses on the Ager and on to the towns along the Danube as far as Hungary.

The River Ager is utilised by several run-of-river power stations for energy generation. The Dürnau run-of-river power station near Vöcklabruck, which came into operation in 1897, utilises a head of 4.6 m to generate electricity, with a standard annual output of 1.9 GWh. Following modernisation in 2021, it has a peak capacity of 1.2 MW and a standard output of 5.8 GWh/a. It is wholly owned by Energie AG. Seven further small power stations operated by KWG (Wankham 1 and 2, Deutenham, Mühlwang, Kaufing, Hart and Timelkam) together generate around 36 GWh of electricity per year.

== Environment ==
=== Landscape ===
The valley area of the Ager is densely populated and characterised by industry, with intensive agricultural land use, dominated by arable farming, in between. Consequently, the river’s natural course is severely impaired by weirs, regulation works and bank reinforcement. Downstream of Vöcklabruck, the Ager takes on a more natural, meandering character; areas of floodplain woodland are also preserved here, some of which (Fasanenau in Vöcklabruck, Schalchhamer Au, Puchheimer Au) are designated as landscape conservation areas.

=== Water quality ===
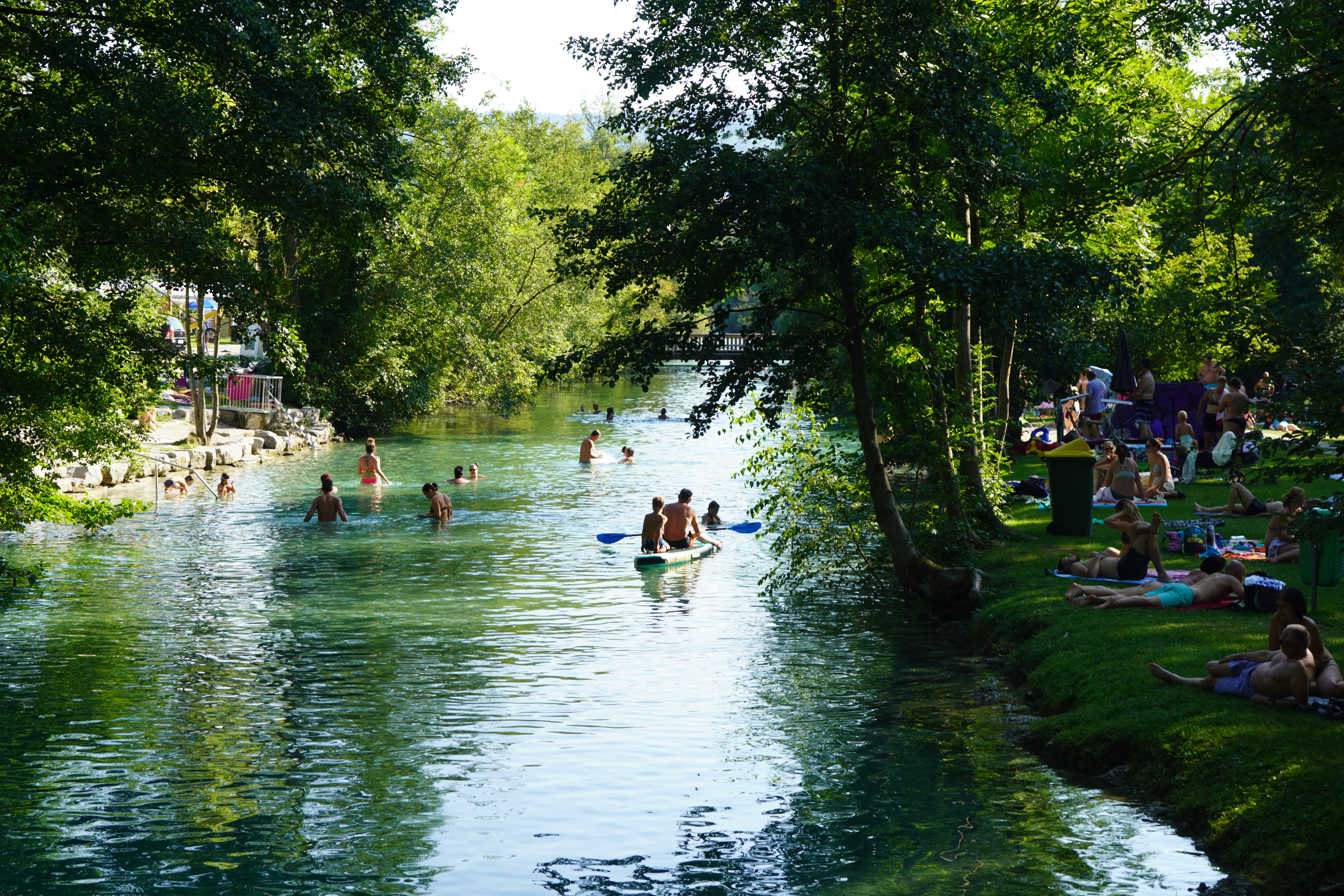
One of the river islands of the Ager, used by many for recreational purposes

In the post-war period, the River Ager was heavily polluted by the industries situated along its banks, notably the Lenzing AG which pumped large quantities of toxic chemical waste into the river for decades, leading to large amounts of red foam forming down stream. This is no longer the case, as several sewage treatment works have been built and the Lenzing AG is slowly going out of business. Whilst the Ager had a water quality rating of only Class III to IV until the mid-1980s, in 2007 it was rated Class I downstream of the Attersee and Class II throughout the rest of its course. As the outlet of several lakes and due to its use as cooling water, the Ager is a relatively warm river for this region, with an average temperature of 17.1 °C in summer and 6.6 °C in winter.

=== Fauna ===
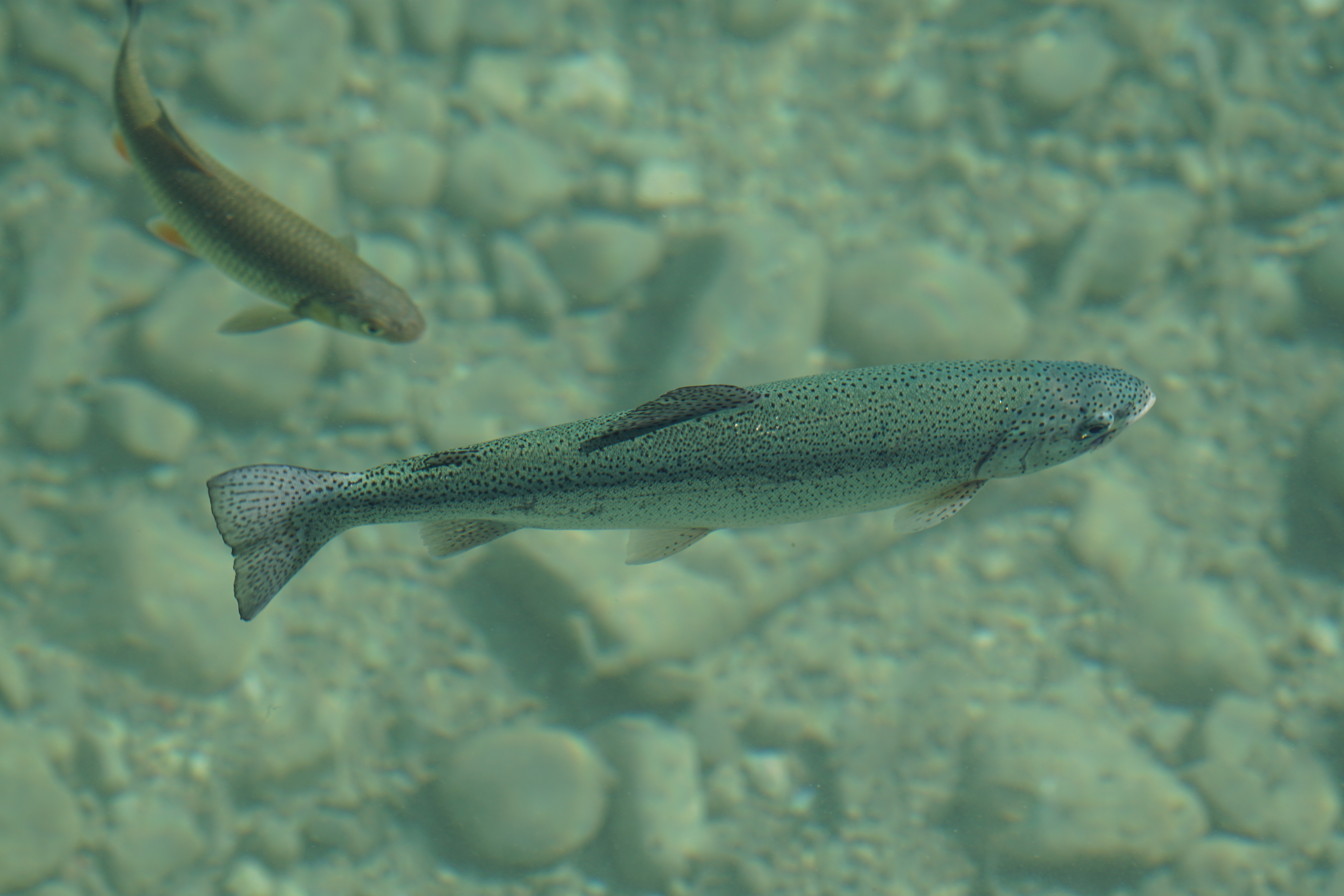
Fisch found in the Ager.

The main species of fish found in the Ager are river trout, rainbow trout, european grayling, european chub and barbel. The unspoilt stretches of the river and its banks provide an important habitat for various bird species, such as the common sandpiper, the little ringed plover and the kingfisher. The most commonly found birds are mallards and their larger relatives, the mute swans which mostly dwell in the upper course of the river close to Lake Attersee. In the floodplains, bird species such as the goosander and the lesser spotted woodpecker can be found, as well as numerous amphibian species such as the common toad, the common frog, the agile frog and the yellow-bellied toad.
