= Polynucleobacter =

Scientific classification
- Domain: Bacteria
- Kingdom: Pseudomonadati
- Phylum: Pseudomonadota
- Class: Betaproteobacteria
- Order: Burkholderiales
- Family: Burkholderiaceae
- Genus: Polynucleobacter; Heckmann & Schmidt 1987

Type species
- Polynucleobacter necessarius

Species
- P. acidiphobus Hahn et al. 2011; P. aenigmaticus Hahn et al. 2017; P. alcilacus Hahn et al. 2022; P. antarcticus Hahn et al. 2022; P. arcticus Hahn et al. 2022; P. asymbioticus Hahn et al. 2016; P. bastaniensis Hahn et al. 2022; P. brandtiae Hahn et al. 2022; P. campilacus Hahn et al. 2018; P. corsicus Hahn et al. 2022; P. cosmopolitanus Hahn et al. 2010; P. difficilis Hahn et al. 2012; P. duraquae Hahn et al. 2016; P. finlandensis Hahn et al. 2022; P. hallstattensis Hahn et al. 2022; P. hirudinilacicola Hahn et al. 2018; P. ibericus Hahn et al. 2022; P. kasalickyi Hahn et al. 2022; P. meluiroseus Pitt et al. 2018; P. necessarius Heckm. & Sch. 1987; P. nymphae Hahn et al. 2022; P. paludilacus Hahn et al. 2022; P. paneuropaeus Hoetzi. et al. 2019; P. parvulilacunae Hahn et al. 2022; P. rarus Hahn et al. 2011; P. sinensis Hahn et al. 2016; P. sphagniphilus Hahn et al. 2017; P. tropicus Hahn et al. 2022; P. victoriensis Hahn et al. 2017; P. wuianus Hahn et al. 2017; P. yangtzensis Hahn et al. 2016

Genus of bacteria

Polynucleobacter is a genus of bacteria, originally established by Heckmann and Schmidt (1987) to exclusively harbor obligate endosymbionts of ciliates belonging to the genus Euplotes.

Recently, several new Polynucleobacter species were described, which all represent free-living (i.e. not host-associated) planktonic freshwater bacteria. Thus, the genus Polynucleobacter currently includes one species containing obligate endosymbionts of ciliates and nine species representing free-living planktonic strains. The type strains of the planktonic species were isolated from freshwater systems located in Antarctica, Armenia, Austria, China, Czech Republic, Finland, France, Germany, Norway, Spain, Uganda, and the United States. Currently, the genus harbors 31 species.

Free-living Poynucleobacter bacteria represent important members of bacterioplankton in freshwater systems such as lakes, ponds, and streams.

== Genomics ==
Two genome projects are finished on P. necessarius strains: one project on an obligately freeliving strain isolated from an acidic freshwater pond, and one project on an obligate endosymbiont of the ciliate Euplotes aediculatus.

Analyses of the genome sequences resulted in the discovery of a conserved RNA motif.
