= Polynucleobacter-1 RNA motif =

Polynucleobacter-1 RNA
- Consensus secondary structure of Polynucleobacter-1 RNAs

Identifiers
- Symbol: Polynucleobacter-1
- Rfam: RF01718

Other data
- RNA type: sRNA
- Domain: Marine metagenome
- PDB structures: PDBe

The Polynucleobacter-1 RNA motif is a conserved RNA structure that was identified by bioinformatics. The RNA structure is predominantly located in genome sequences derived from DNA extracted from uncultivated marine samples. However it was also predicted in the genome of Polynucleobacter species QLW-P1DMWA-1, a kind of betaproteobacteria. The RNAs are often located near to a conserved gene that might be homologous to a gene found in a phage that infects cyanobacteria. However, it is unknown if the RNA is used by phages.
