= Polynucleobacter cosmopolitanus =

Scientific classification
- Domain: Bacteria
- Kingdom: Pseudomonadati
- Phylum: Pseudomonadota
- Class: Betaproteobacteria
- Order: Burkholderiales
- Family: Burkholderiaceae
- Genus: Polynucleobacter
- Species: P. cosmopolitanus

Binomial name
- Polynucleobacter cosmopolitanus Hahn et al. 2010

Type strain
- MWH-MoIso2, DSM 21490, CIP 109840, LMG 25212

Species of bacterium

Polynucleobacter cosmopolitanus is an aerobic, catalase- and oxidase-positive, chemo-organotrophic, nonmotile bacterium of the genus Polynucleobacter, isolated from freshwater habitats in Eurasia, South America, North America, Africa, Oceania, the Hawaiian Archipelago, in lakes located in Japan, and a river estuary of northern Taiwan. The type strain of the species was isolated from Lake Mondsee in Austria.
