= Pinsdorf =

- Municipality
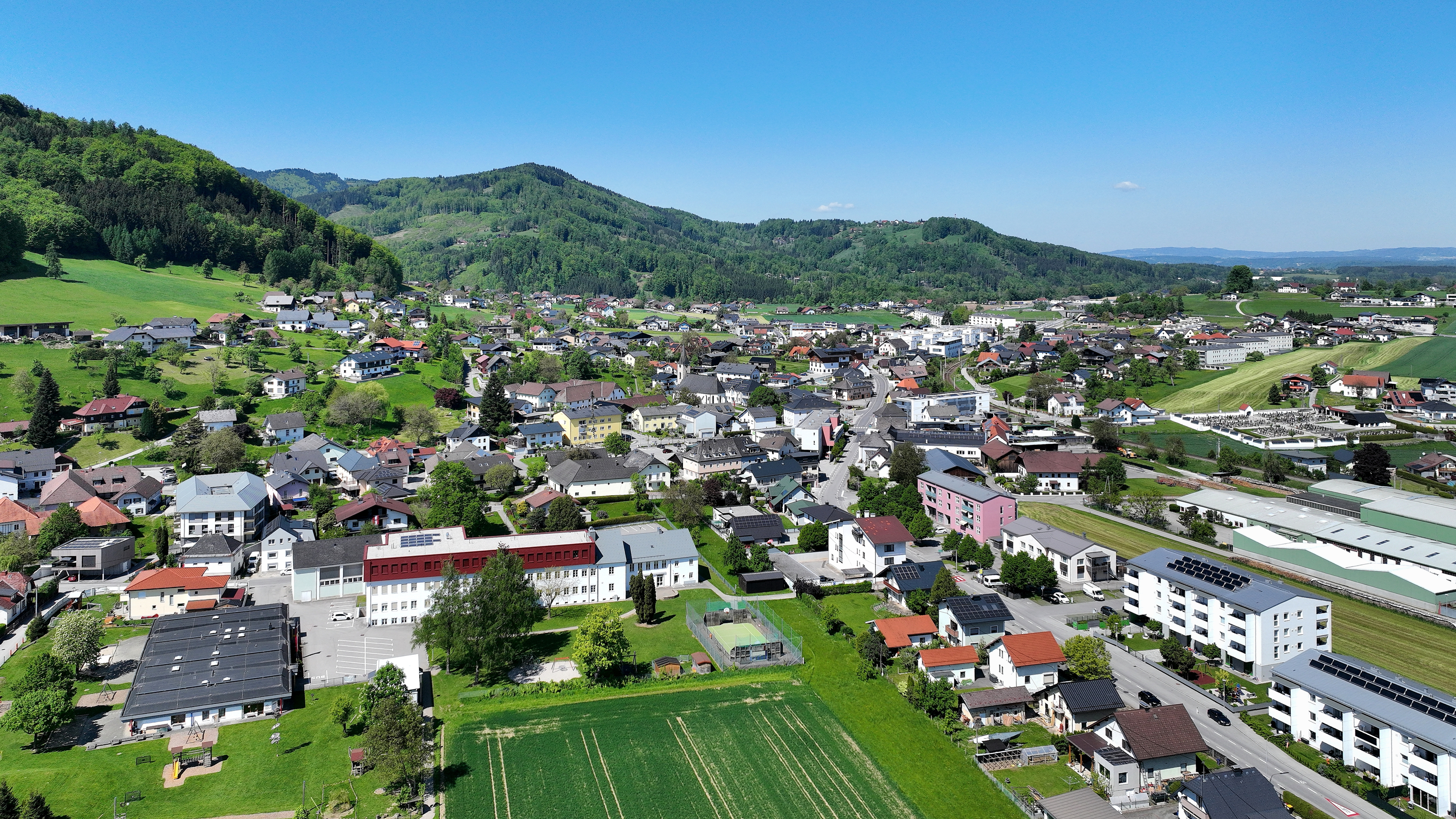
- East-southeast view of Pinsdorf

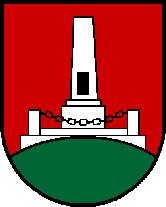
- Coat of arms

- Location within Austria
- Coordinates: 47°55′49″N 13°46′01″E
- Country: Austria
- State: Upper Austria
- District: Gmunden

Government
  - Mayor: Dieter Helms (SPÖ)

Area
  - Total: 12.47 km^{2} (4.81 sq mi)
- Elevation: 493 m (1,617 ft)

Population (2018-01-01)
  - Total: 3,849
  - Density: 308.7/km^{2} (799.4/sq mi)
- Time zone: UTC+1 (CET)
  - Summer (DST): UTC+2 (CEST)
- Postal code: 4812
- Area code: 07612
- Vehicle registration: GM
- Website: www.pinsdorf.ooe.gv.at

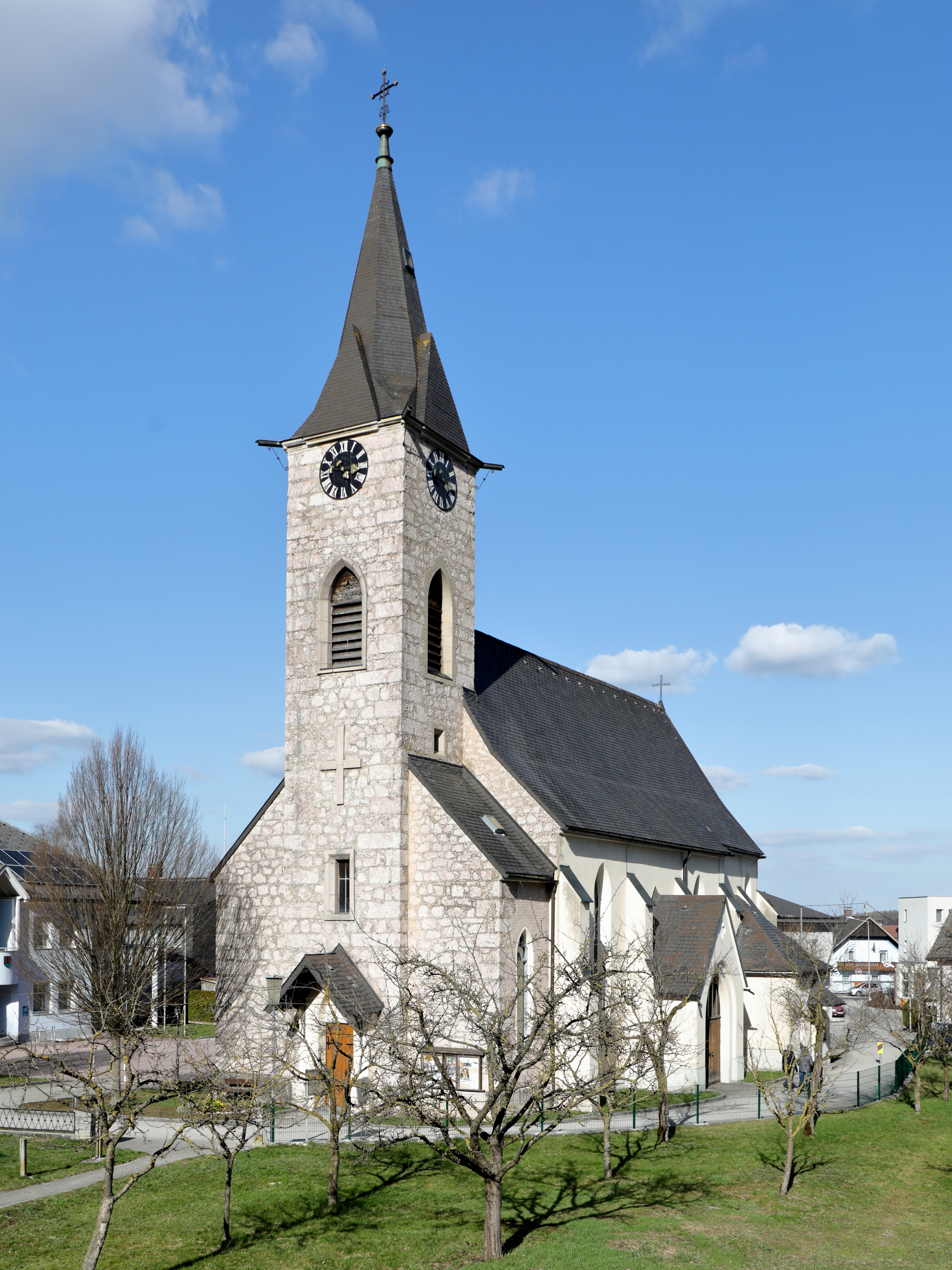
Parish church Saint Matthias

Pinsdorf is a village in the Austrian state of Upper Austria in the district of Gmunden.

== History ==
The Bauernhügel is an obelisk-styled memorial in Pinsdorf, constructed to pay tribute to people killed in the brutal Battle of Gmunden between the Bavarian stadtholder Adam Graf von Herbertstorff and the farmers, who resided in Pinsdorf (German page de:Oberösterreichischer Bauernkrieg). The farmers fought against the Counter-Reformation. A plaque on the memorial states the remains of the slain farmers are buried under the hill (see below: Coat of arms).

== Geography ==
The river Aurach flows through the village. There are several notable hills in the settlement's immediate surroundings, including the Pinsdorfberg, the Gmundnerberg, the Vöcklaberg and the Kronberg.

== Local Outline ==
The municipality includes the following 10 villages (in brackets population as of January 1, 2018):

- Buchen (438)
- Großkufhaus (591)
- Innergrub (227)
- Moos (172)
- Neuhofen (153)
- Pinsdorf (1240)
- Pinsdorfberg (159)
- Steinbichl (211)
- Wiesen (558)
- Wolfsgrub (100)

== Population ==
Historical population
Year	Pop.	±%
1869	1,324	—
1880	1,304	−1.5%
1890	1,378	+5.7%
1900	1,552	+12.6%
1910	1,721	+10.9%
1923	1,684	−2.1%
1934	1,823	+8.3%
1939	1,814	−0.5%
1951	2,057	+13.4%
1961	2,349	+14.2%
1971	2,716	+15.6%
1981	2,806	+3.3%
1991	3,176	+13.2%
2001	3,441	+8.3%
2016	3,821	+11.0%

== Politics ==
The results of the last election of the local government in 2015:

- SPÖ: 9 mandates (38,42%)
- ÖVP: 5 mandates (19,30%)
- FPÖ: 11 mandates (42,29%)

Dieter Helms (SPÖ) is the current mayor of Pinsdorf. The current vice-mayor is Christa Schiemel(SPÖ)

=== Twin town ===
- Altdorf (Germany)
