= Polynucleobacter necessarius =

Scientific classification
- Domain: Bacteria
- Kingdom: Pseudomonadati
- Phylum: Pseudomonadota
- Class: Betaproteobacteria
- Order: Burkholderiales
- Family: Burkholderiaceae
- Genus: Polynucleobacter
- Species: P. necessarius

Binomial name
- Polynucleobacter necessarius Heckmann and Schmidt 1987

Synonyms
- Omicron or Omikron

Species of bacterium

Polynucleobacter necessarius is a bacterium of the genus Polynucleobacter.

== Bacteria ==
These bacteria were discovered by the German microbiologist Klaus Heckmann in the cytoplasm of the ciliate Euplotes aediculatus and designated as Omikron (Omicron in English literature). In 1987 Omikron / Omicron was scientifically described by Klaus Heckmann and Helmut Schmidt as the new species (and genus) Polynucleobacter necessarius. Later free-living Polynucleobacter bacteria were discovered in the water columns of lakes and ponds. These planktonic, non-endosymbiontic members of the genus Polynucleobacter were initially assigned to a new subspecies of the species P. necessarius but later transferred to separate species. Since the last revision of the species, it contains exclusively obligate endosymbionts dwelling in cells of the ciliate Euplotes aediculatus and related species. This is in contrast to other species of the genus Polynucleobacter, which exclusively harbour free-living bacteria dwelling in the water column of freshwater systems (lake, ponds, puddles and running waters). The genome of P. necessarius has been completely sequenced.

== See also ==
- List of sequenced bacterial genomes
