= Mondsee (lake) =

Lake in Austria

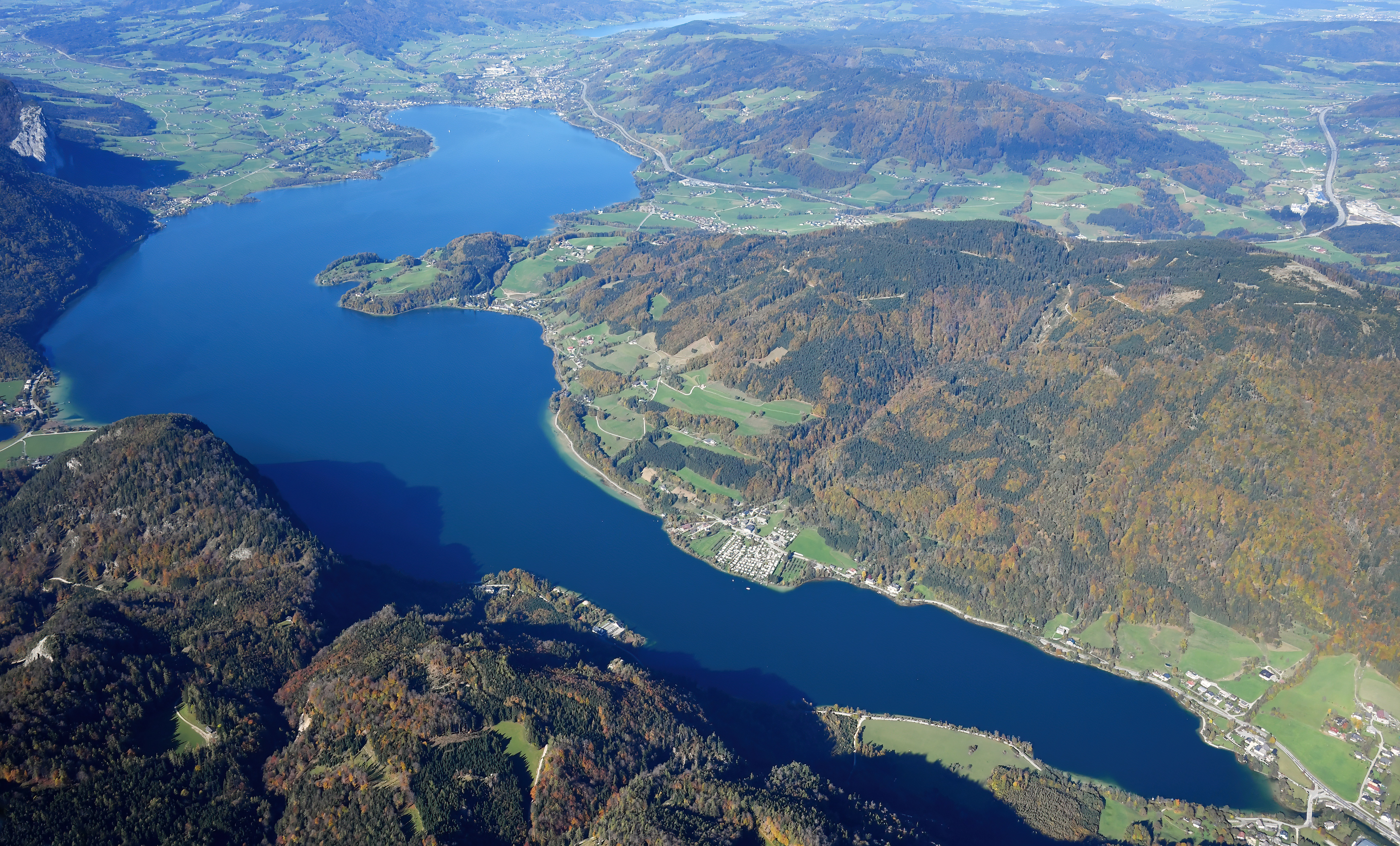
- Aerial view

- Location within Austria
- Location: Salzkammergut
- Coordinates: 47°49′N 13°23′E
- Primary inflows: Fuschler Ache, Zeller Ache
- Primary outflows: Seeache
- Basin countries: Austria
- Surface area: 14.2 km^{2} (5.5 sq mi)
- Max. depth: 68 m (223 ft)
- Surface elevation: 481 m (1,578 ft)
- Settlements: Mondsee

Mondsee (Moon Lake) is a lake in the Upper Austrian part of the Salzkammergut and near the larger Attersee. Its southwestern shore marks the border between the states of Upper Austria and Salzburg and also between the Northern Limestone Alps in the south and the Sandstone zone of the northern Alps. The Drachenwand (Dragonwall) is a large cliff face over the southern shore of the lake. Mondsee is one of Austria's last privately owned lakes. In August 2008, owner Nicolette Wächter announced it was up for sale.

In 1864, remains of Neolithic pile dwellings were discovered in the lake.

== New species discovered in Lake Mondsee ==
Two bacterial strains isolated from Lake Mondsee were recognized as new species and described as Polynucleobacter cosmopolitanus and Polynucleobacter duraquae, respectively. Both species are non-pathogenic and dwell in the lake as part of its bacterioplankton.

== Fish community of Lake Mondsee ==
Fish living in the lake:

- esox
- lake trout
- brown trout
- rainbow trout
- The lake char became locally extinct in the last quarter of the 20th century
- European eel
- carp
- burbot
- whitefish

== Mondsee in fiction ==
Ian Fleming mentions the Mondsee in his 1961 James Bond novel, Thunderball. In chapter six, Blofeld reports to the members of SPECTRE that their German unit has successfully retrieved (in secret) Himmler's hoard of jewels from Lake Mondsee.

Arno Geiger's 2018 novel Beneath Drachenwand Mountain is set mainly in Mondsee.

== Gallery ==
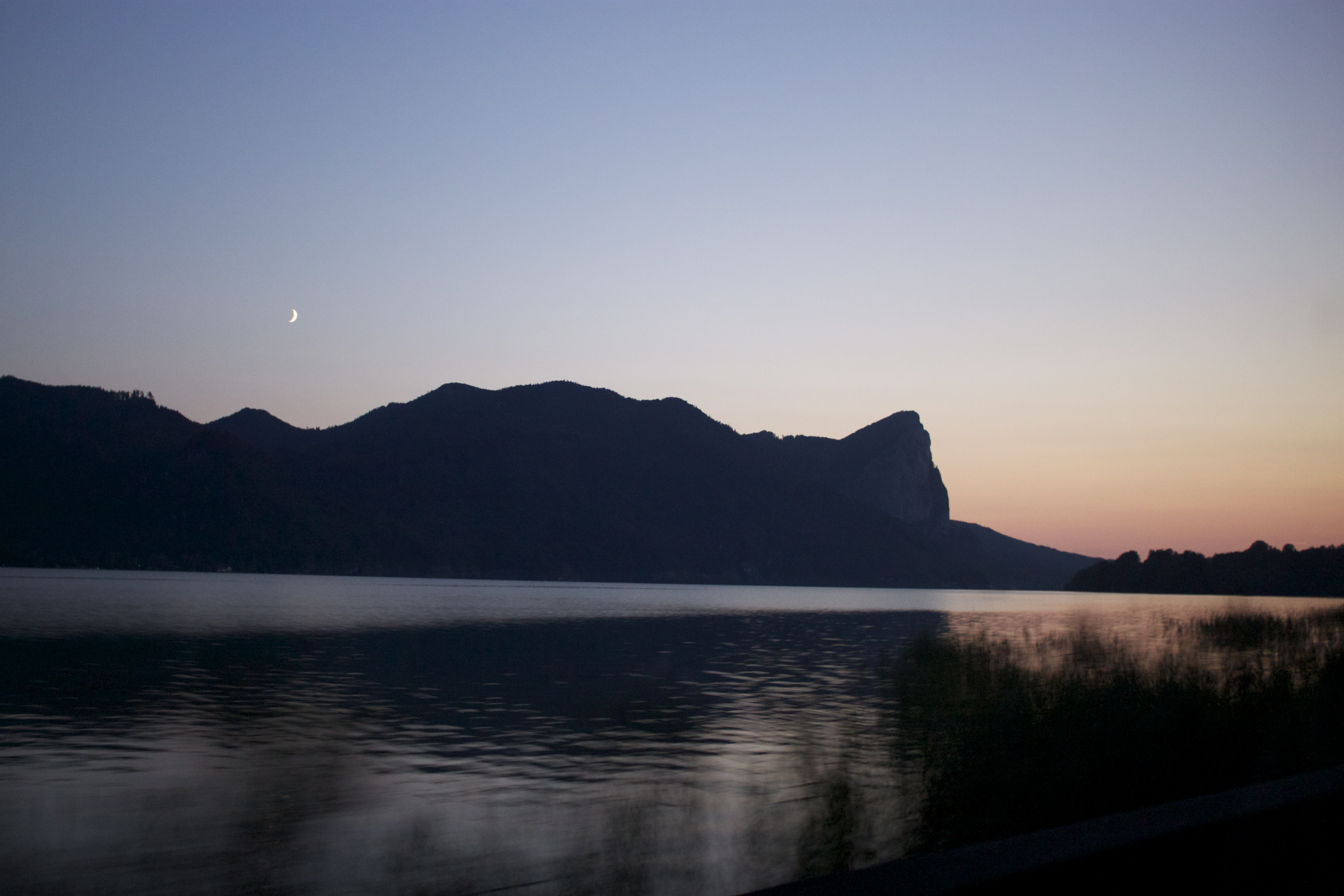

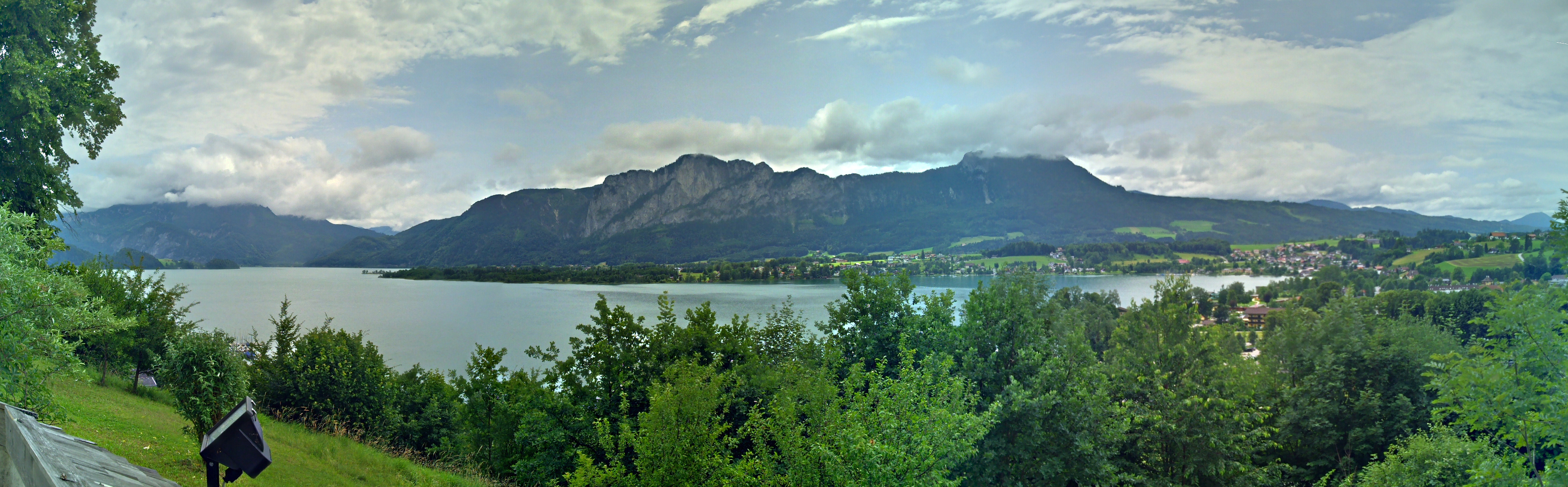

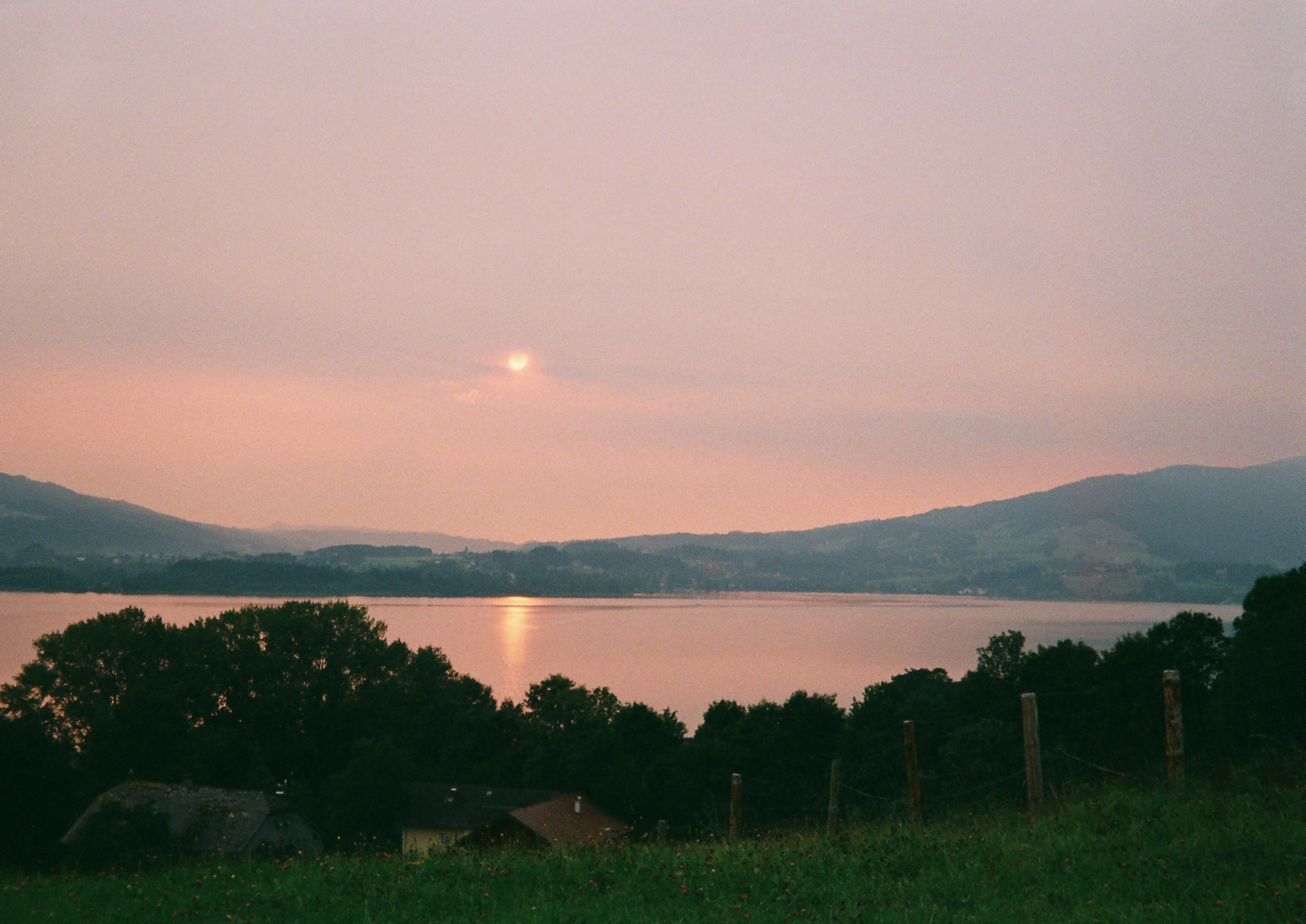

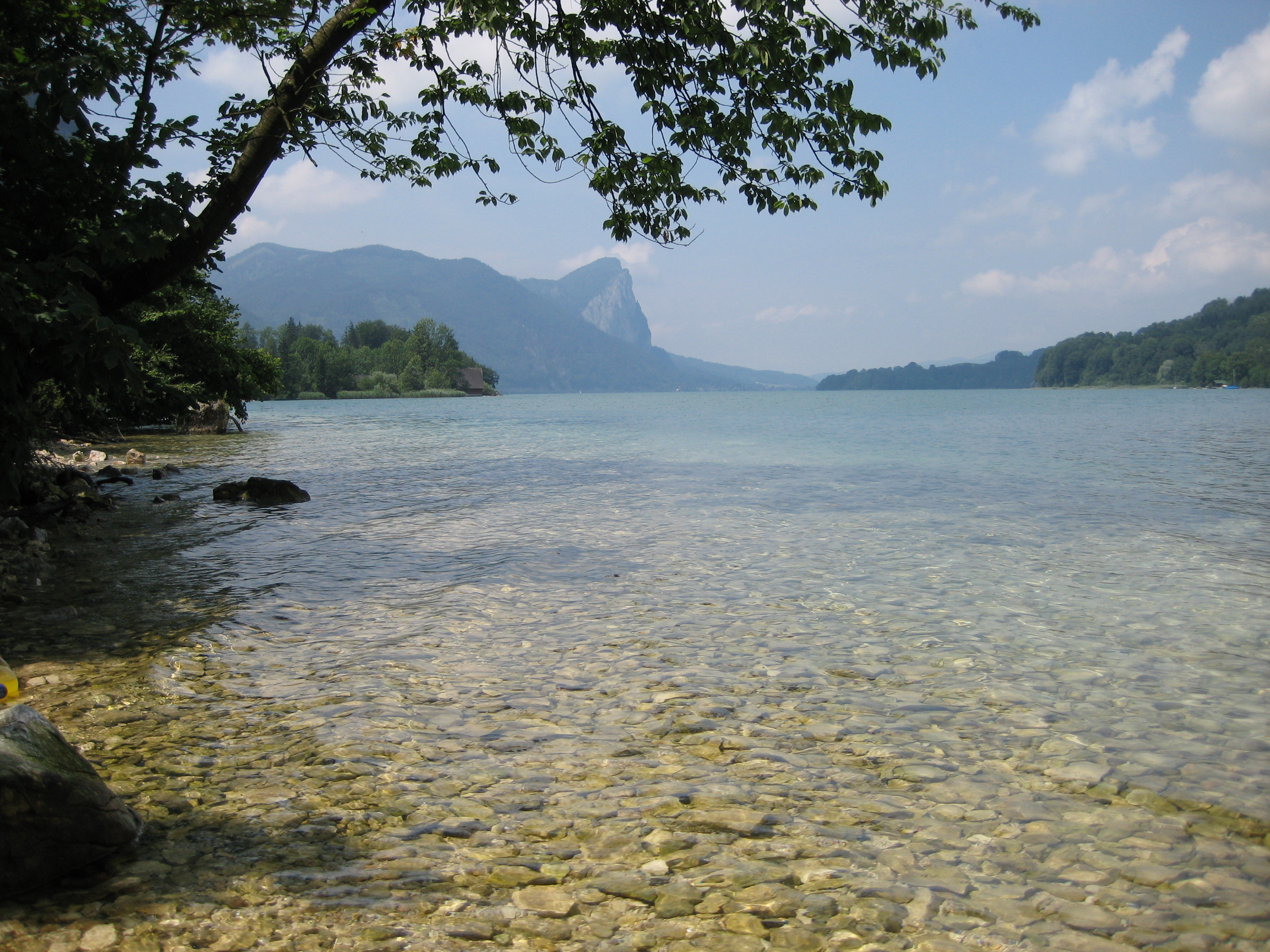

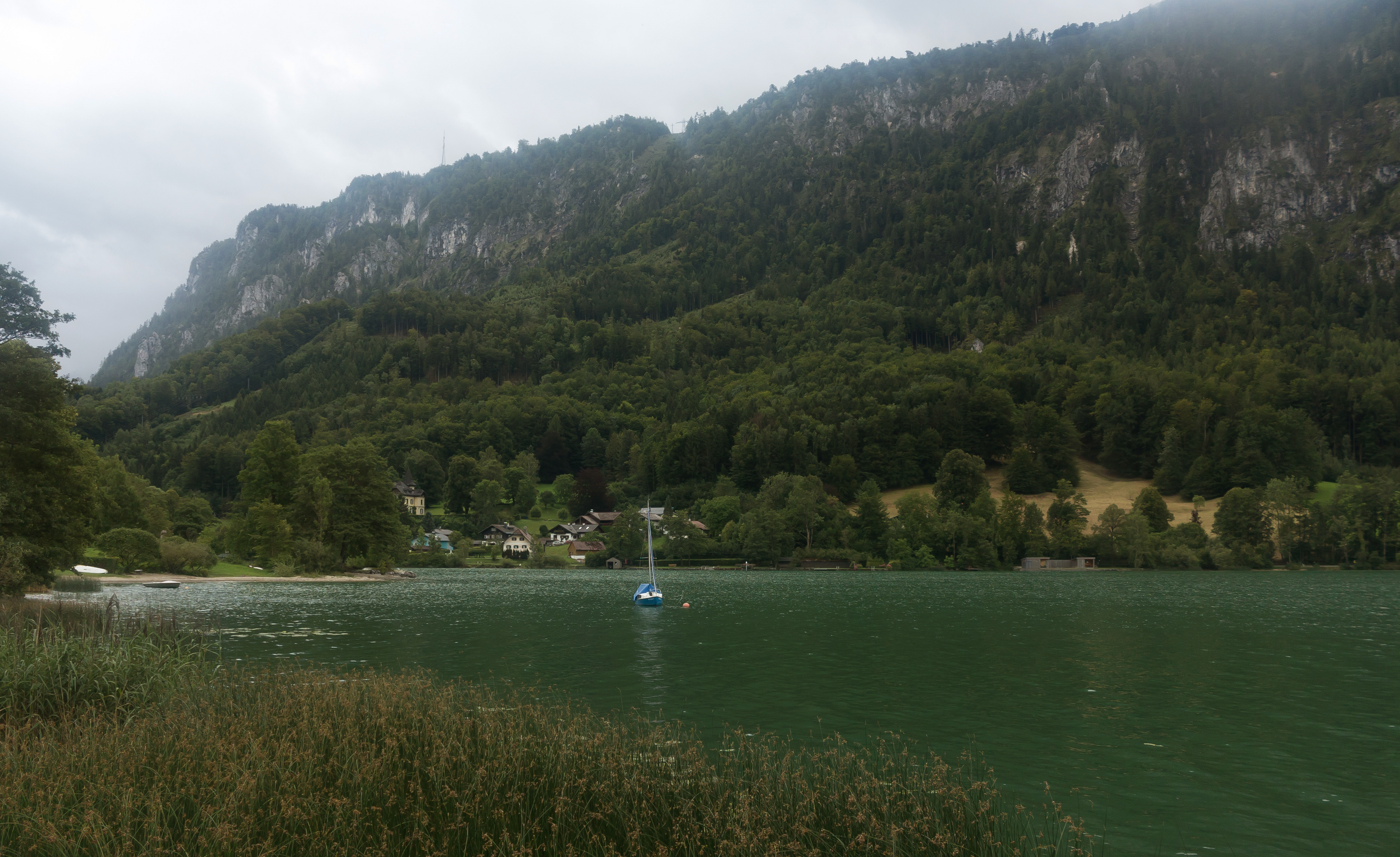

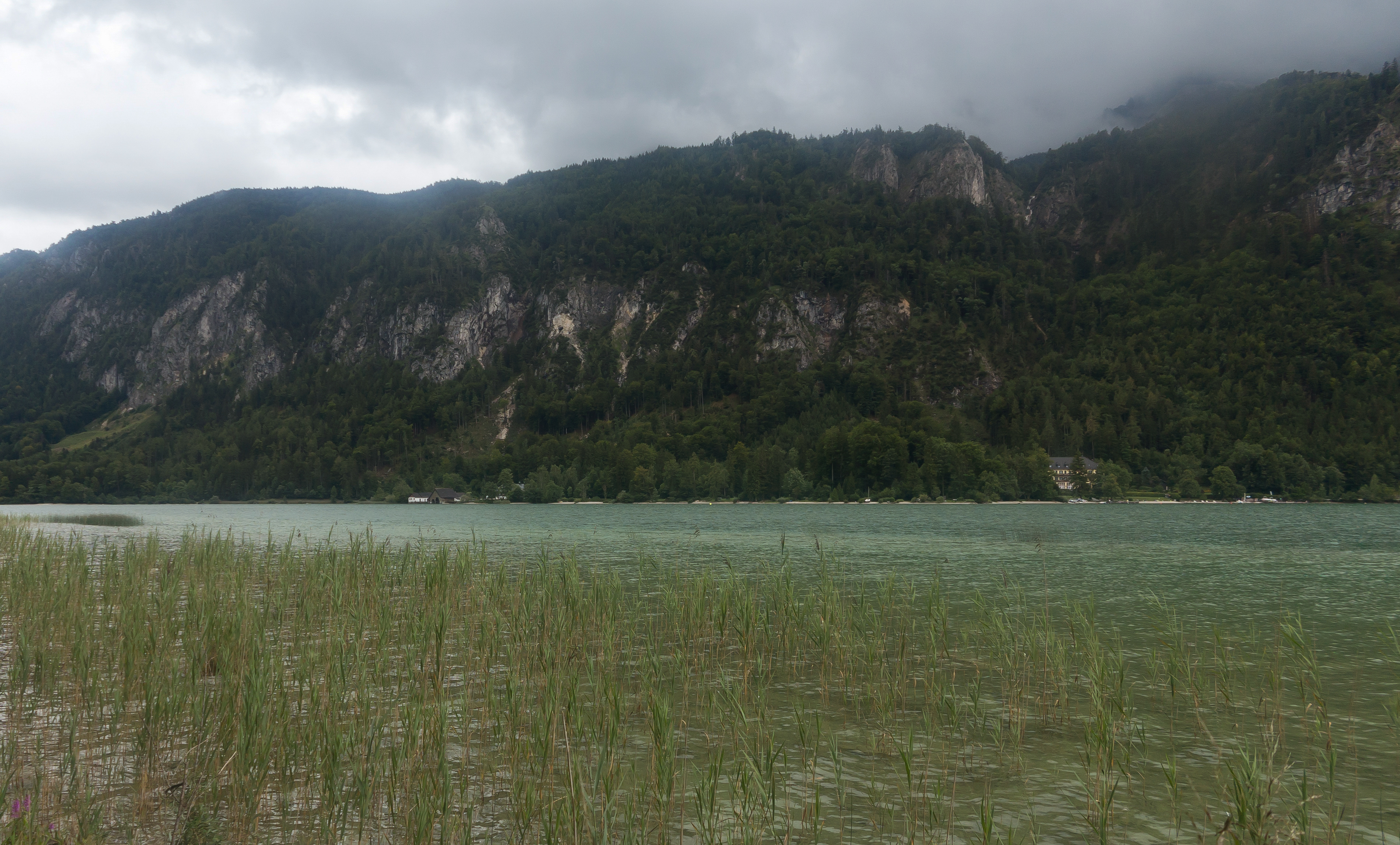

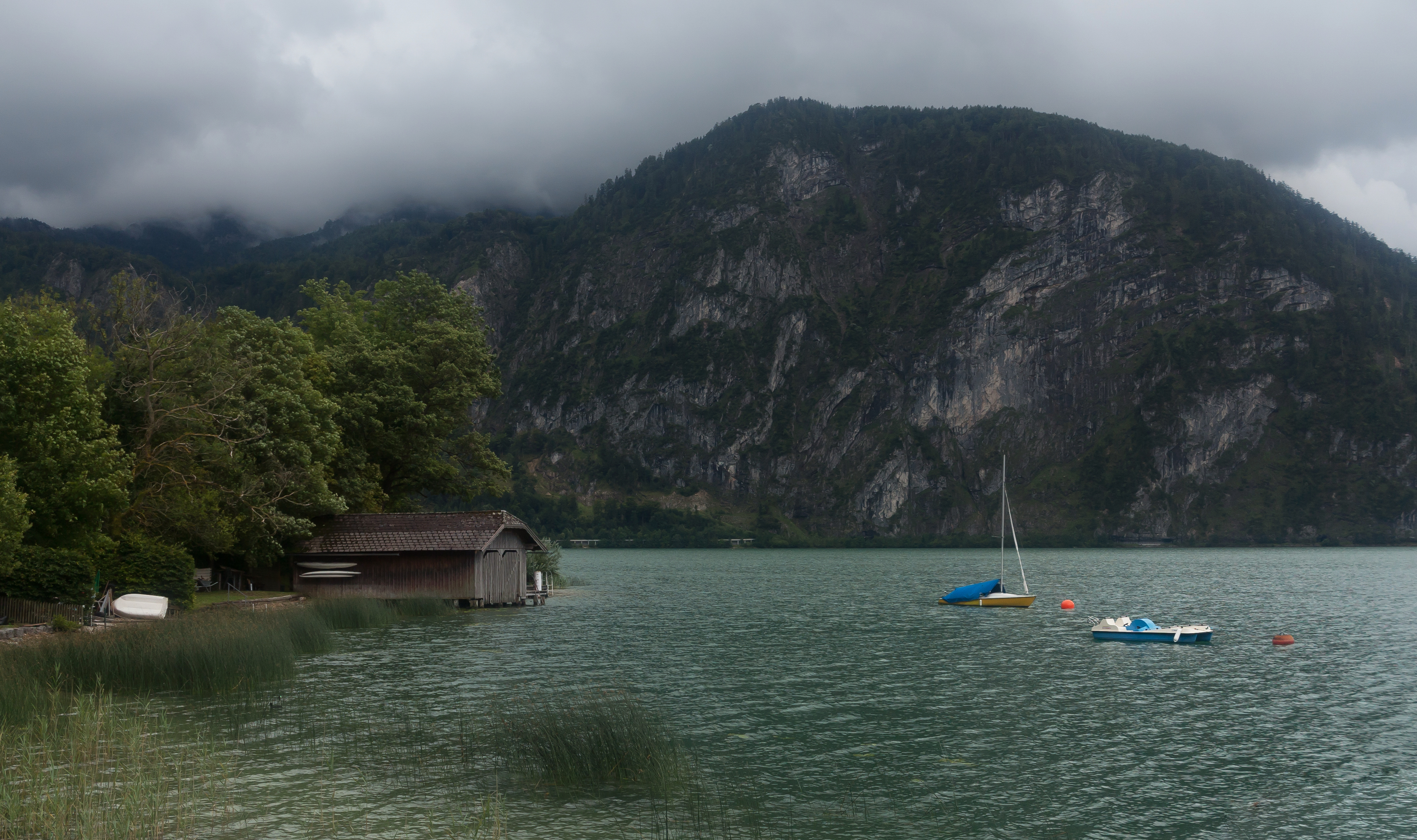
