= Regau =

- Municipality
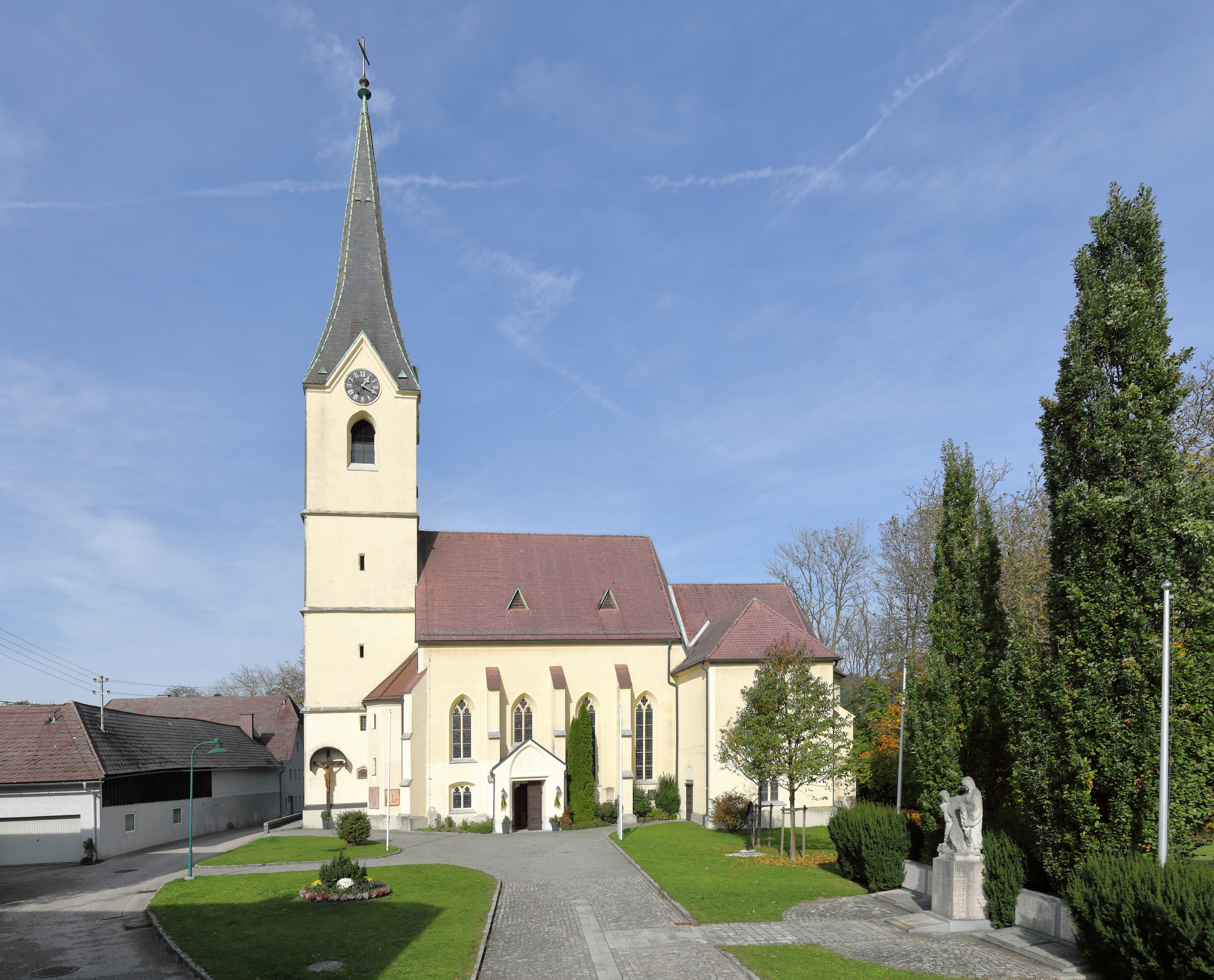

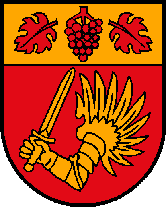
- Coat of arms

- Location within Austria
- Coordinates: 47°59′31″N 13°41′17″E
- Country: Austria
- State: Upper Austria
- District: Vöcklabruck

Government
  - Mayor: Peter Harringer (ÖVP)

Area
  - Total: 33.97 km^{2} (13.12 sq mi)
- Elevation: 429 m (1,407 ft)

Population (2018-01-01)
  - Total: 6,780
  - Density: 200/km^{2} (517/sq mi)
- Time zone: UTC+1 (CET)
  - Summer (DST): UTC+2 (CEST)
- Postal code: 4844
- Area code: 07672
- Vehicle registration: VB
- Website: www.regau.at

Regau is a municipality in the Austrian state of Upper Austria near Vöcklabruck, which is the capital of the district.

== Geography ==
Regau is bordered on the north by the river Ager. Another important body of water is the Baggersee, an artificial lake where many people like to stay in summer for swimming or other sports. Regau's football stadium, used by the Union Regau, is located nearby.

The municipality is composed of 36 smaller villages of which Schalchham with more than 1000 inhabitants is the largest. Other important villages are of course Regau, Rutzenmoos (a predominantly Protestant village with a church), Wankham, and the Lixlau.

About 53,5% of Regau's area is used for agriculture, another third is covered by forests.

== History ==
Regau's was first mentioned in a deed more than 1200 years ago, in 800 CE. At that time, Regau was the seat of the Earls of Rebegau Their castle is thought to have been near the village of Burgstall (translated: castle stable), which still exists.

The origin of the name Regau was the Latin Repagauve; later, this became Rebengau in German. Over time, this name was shortened and nowadays the municipality is called Regau. All its names show that Regau once was famous for viniculture.

From the twelfth century Regau has been part of the Duchy of Austria, before that it was part of Bavaria. Since 1490 Regau has been part of the princedom Austria above the Enns, today called Upper Austria, of which Regau has been a part since 1918.

June, 28th of 1981 Regau was officially given a coat of arms. In 2000 Regau was elevated from village to market. (In Austria there are three different kinds of municipalities: villages, markets and cities.)

== Culture and sights ==
Rutzenmoos is the home of the Protestant Museum of Upper Austria

In Regau there are many traditional associations such as:

- The Regau civil guard
- The Regau civil guard's band
- a group of Goldhauben

and one society for contemporary culture, which is named Treffpunkt Kulturverein Regau.

Moreover, there are many other societies.

There are three churches in Regau:

- St. Peter's church in Regau's centre, a gothic building
- St. Vitus church in Upper Regau
- the Protestant church of Rutzenmoos

Regau is connected to the Way of St. James.

The Union Regau is the municipality's most important sporting club.
