= Bacterioplankton =

Bacterial component of the plankton that drifts in the water column

Bacterioplankton are the bacterial component of the plankton that drifts in the water column. The name comes from the Ancient Greek word πλαγκτός (planktós), meaning "wandering" or "drifting", and bacterium, a Latin term coined in the 19th century by Christian Gottfried Ehrenberg. They are found in both seawater and fresh water.

Bacterioplankton occupy a range of ecological niches in marine and aquatic ecosystems. They are both primary producers and primary consumers in these ecosystems and drive global biogeochemical cycling of elements essential for life (e.g., carbon and nitrogen). Many bacterioplankton species are autotrophic, and derive energy from either photosynthesis or chemosynthesis. Photosynthetic bacterioplankton are often categorized as picophytoplankton, and include major cyanobacterial groups such as Prochlorococcus and Synechococcus. Other heterotrophic bacterioplankton are saprotrophic, and obtain energy by consuming organic material produced by other organisms. This material may be dissolved in the medium and taken directly from there, or bacteria may live and grow in association with particulate material such as marine snow. Bacterioplankton play critical roles in global nitrogen fixation, nitrification, denitrification, remineralisation and methanogenesis.

Bacterioplankton abundance depends on environmental variables like temperature, nutrient availability and predation. Like other small plankton, the bacterioplankton are preyed upon by zooplankton (usually protozoans), and their numbers are also controlled through infection by bacteriophages.

== Major groups ==
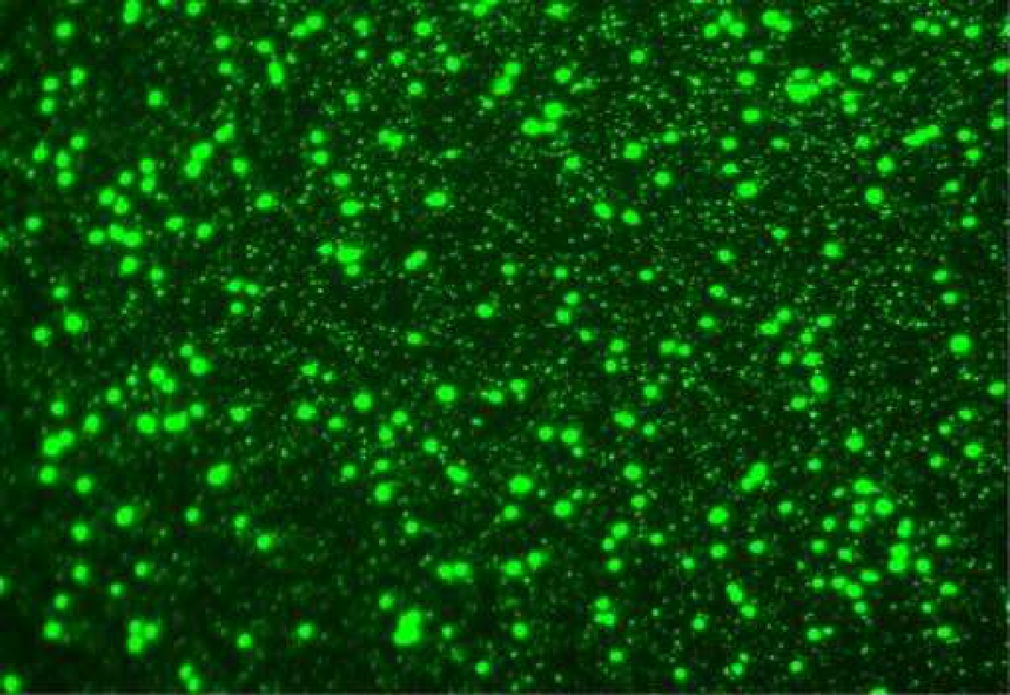
Image from an epifluorescence microscope of seawater stained with a green dye to reveal bacterial cells and smaller viral particles

=== Photosynthetic bacterioplankton ===
Photosynthetic bacterioplankton are responsible for a large proportion of the total primary production of aquatic food webs, supplying organic compounds to higher trophic levels. These bacteria undergo oxygenic and anoxygenic photosynthesis. Differences between these processes can be seen in the byproducts produced, the primary electron donor, and the light harvesting pigments used for energy capture.

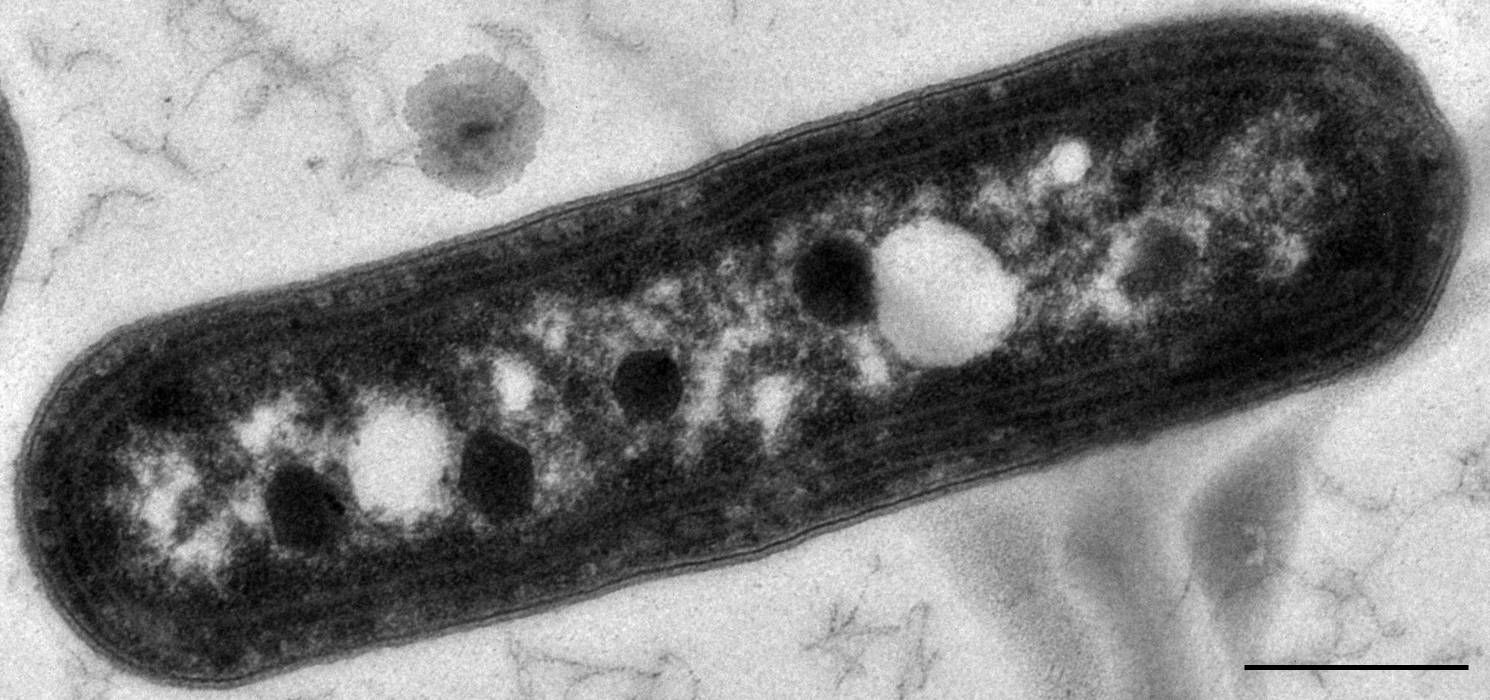
Transmission electron micrograph showing the cyanobacteria Synechococcus elongatus

Cyanobacteria are a large group of photosynthetic bacterioplankton, often growing as cells or in filamentous colonies. These organisms are the dominant group of bacterioplankton using oxygenic photosynthesis in aquatic ecosystems. Cyanobacteria, along with photosynthetic eukaryotes, are responsible for approximately half of the total global primary production making them key players in the food web. They use photosynthesis to generate energy in the form of organic compounds and produce oxygen as a byproduct. Major light harvesting pigments include chlorophylls, phycoerytherin, phycocyanin and carotenoids. The majority of cyanobacteria found in marine environments are represented by the genera Synechococcus and Prochlorococcus. Synechococcus is cosmopolitan, having been reported across temperate and tropical waters. Prochlorococcus is a very small in size and is found mainly in the euphotic zone of tropical waters. Factors including light, nutrients, and temperature can cause cyanobacteria to proliferate and form harmful blooms. Cyanobacteria blooms can cause hypoxia and produce high levels of toxins, impacting other aquatic organisms as well as causing illnesses in humans.

Some Cyanobacteria are capable of nitrogen fixation. The genus Anabaena uses specialized cells called heterocysts to physically separate nitrogen fixation and photosynthesis. Trichodesmium is an example of cyanobacteria that is capable of fixing nitrogen through an alternative photosynthetic pathway.

Other photosynthetic bacterioplankton, including purple and green bacteria, undergo anoxygenic photosynthesis in anaerobic conditions. The pigments synthesized in these organisms are sensitive to oxygen. In purple bacteria the major pigments include bacteriochlorophyll a and b and carotenoids. Green bacteria have different light harvesting pigments consisting of bacteriochlorophyll c, d and e. These organisms do not produce oxygen through photosynthesis or use water as a reducing agent. Many of these organisms use sulfur, hydrogen or other compounds as an energy source to drive photosynthesis. Most of these bacterioplankton are found in anoxic waters, including stagnant and hypersaline environments.

=== Heterotrophic bacterioplankton ===
Heterotrophic bacterioplankton rely on the available concentration of dissolved organic matter in the water column. Usually these organisms are saprophytic, absorbing nutrients from their surroundings. These heterotrophs also play a key role in the microbial loop and the remineralization of organic compounds like carbon and nitrogen. Pelagibacterales (synonym SAR11), also known as members of an Alphaproteobacteria clade, are the most abundant bacterioplankton in the oceans. Members of this group are found in waters with low nutrient availability and are preyed on by protists.

Roseobacter is a diverse and widely distributed clade which makes up a significant contribution of marine bacterioplankton, accounting up to roughly 20% of coastal waters and 15% mixed layer surface oceans. Although many are heterotrophic, some are capable of performing a unique form of photosynthesis called aerobic anoxygenic phototrophy, which requires rather than produces oxygen.

== Biogeochemical cycling ==
=== Carbon ===
Atmospheric carbon is sequestered into the ocean by three main pumps which have been known for 30 years: the solubility pump, the carbonate pump, and the biological carbon pump (BCP). The biological carbon pump is a vertical transmission pump driven mainly by the sinking of organic rich particles. Bacterial phytoplankton near the surface incorporate atmospheric CO_{2} and other nutrients into their biomass during photosynthesis. At the time of their death these phytoplankton, along with their incorporated carbon, sink to the bottom of the ocean where the carbon remains for thousands of years. The other biologically mediated sequestration of carbon in the ocean occurs through the microbial pump. The microbial pump is responsible for the production of old recalcitrant dissolved organic carbon (DOC) which is >100 years old. Plankton in the ocean are incapable of breaking down this recalcitrant DOC and thus it remains in the oceans for 1000s years without being respired. The two pumps work simultaneously, and the balance between them is believed to vary based on the availability of nutrients. Overall, the oceans act as a sink for atmospheric CO_{2} but also release some carbon back into the atmosphere. This occurs when bacterioplankton and other organisms in the ocean consume organic matter and respire CO_{2}, and as a result of the solubility equilibrium between the ocean and the atmosphere.

=== Nitrogen ===
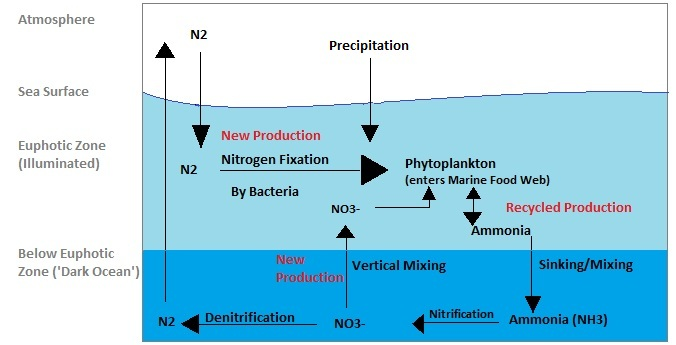
A schematic showing the cycling of nitrogen within the ocean.

The nitrogen cycle in the oceans is mediated by microorganisms, many of which are bacteria, performing multiple conversions such as: nitrogen fixation, denitrification, assimilation, and anaerobic ammonia oxidation (anammox). There are many different nitrogen metabolism strategies employed by bacterioplankton. Starting with molecular nitrogen in the atmosphere (N_{2}), which is fixed by diazotrophs such as trichodesmium into usable forms like ammonia (NH^{+}_{4}). This ammonia can then be assimilated into organic matter like amino and nucleic acids, by both photoautrophic and heterotrophic plankton, it can also be nitrified to NO^{−}_{3} for energy production by nitrifying bacteria. Finally the use of NO^{−}_{3} or NO^{−}_{2} as terminal electron acceptors reduces the nitrogen back into N_{2,} which is then released back into the atmosphere thus closing the cycle. Another important process involved in the regeneration of atmospheric N_{2} is anammox. Anammox, a process in which ammonia is combined with nitrite in order to produce diatomic nitrogen and water, could account for 30–50% of production of N_{2} in the ocean.

An analysis on metagenomes of 83 species of cyanobacteria has suggested the possible dissimilatory nitrate reduction to ammonium (DNRA) activity in certain cyanobacteria. Namely, the study found the presence of the NirBD gene, which is a marker for DNRA function, in the families Leptolyngbyaceae and Nostocaceae. Moreover, the study indicated that the cyanobacteria that had NirBD are largely also non-heterocyst nitrogen fixers, suggesting possible alternative strategies of acquiring nitrogen under varying environmental conditions. Nonetheless, the NirBD gene is also known to play a role in nitrogen assimilation and further studies are required to ascertain the function of NirBD in cyanobacteria.

=== Dissolved organic matter ===
Dissolved organic matter (DOM) is available in many forms in the ocean, and is responsible for supporting the growth of bacteria and microorganisms in the ocean. The two main sources of this dissolved organic matter are; decomposition of higher trophic level organisms like plants and fish, and secondly DOM in runoffs that pass through soil with high levels of organic material. The age and quality of the DOM is important for its usability by microbes. The majority of the DOM in the oceans is refractory or semi-labile and is not available for biodegradation. As mentioned above the microbial pump is responsible for the production of refractory DOM which is unavailable for biodegradation and remains dissolved in the oceans for thousands of years. The turnover of labile DOM organic material is quite high due to scarcity, this is important for the support of multiple trophic levels in the microbial community. The uptake and respiration of DOM by heterotrophs closes the cycle by producing CO_{2.}

=== Sulfur ===
Bacterioplankton, such as members of Roseobacter, SAR11, and Gammaproteobacteria, are known to contribute significantly towards the sulfur cycle, primarily through the metabolism of dimethylsulfoniopropionate (DMSP). DMSP can be catabolized either via means of cleavage to dimethylsulfide (DMS) or demethylation by bacterioplankton, in which both have contrasting effects on the sulfur cycle. The formation of DMS contributes to the sulfur flux into the atmosphere and according to the CLAW hypothesis, plays a role in regulating global climate. Increased production of sulfate aerosols from DMS oxidation are capable of promoting cooling on a global scale, via the promotion of cloud formation. In contrast, the demethylation pathway from DMSP to methanethiol results in the integration of carbon and sulfur into the organism itself as opposed to releasing the elements back to the environment. Bacterioplankton DMSP degradation is thought to be prevalent in marine surface waters, although the spatial distribution of the two aforementioned routes of degradation exhibit high variation.

Similar to DNRA, the same study indicated the presence of a dsyB-like gene in certain cyanobacteria genomes, suggesting DMSP producing ability. However, there has yet to be empirical confirmation of DMSP synthesis in cyanobacteria.

=== Silica ===
Diatoms are a major group of phytoplankton in which most have a requirement for silicon as biogenic silica to form their cell wall (known as frustule). Upon predation or death, particulate silica is released from diatoms but they need to be dissolved for recycling and reuptake by diatoms, otherwise silica will be exported out and deposited into sediment. Hence, the productivity of diatoms will be limited by silicon if dissolution rates are slow. However, it is known that bacterioplankton (i.e. members of Cytophaga-Flavobacterium-Bacteroides, Alphaproteobacteria, and Gammaproteobacteria) significantly promote the dissolution of particulate silica, thus maintaining the significant biogenic silica production in the ocean photic zone. It is also suggested that this process helps regulate diatom productivity and its corresponding biogeochemical effects.

== Trophic interactions ==
Schematic of the food chain in the freshwaters of Lake Ontario.

Variations in bacterioplankton abundance are usually a result of temperature, zooplankton grazing, and availability of substrate. Bacterial abundance and productivity are consistently related to algal abundance and productivity as well as organic carbon. Additionally, phosphorus directly influences both algal and bacterial abundance and in turn, algae and bacteria directly influence each other's abundance In extremely oligotrophic environments, both bacterial and algal growth is limited by phosphorus, but because bacteria are better competitors they obtain a larger portion of the inorganic substrate and increase in abundance more rapidly than algae.

In marine pelagic environments, heterotrophic nano-flagellates are the most probable consumers of bacterial cell production. Cultured flagellates in laboratory experiments demonstrate that they are adapted to predation on bacteria-sized particles and occur in concentrations to control bacterial biomass. Tight fluctuations in numbers of bacteria and flagellates have been found in a eutrophic estuary, particularly in the summer. The amplitude of these fluctuations increases in response to artificial eutrophication with inorganic nutrients and decreases in response to predation. Losses of bacterioplankton by grazing is indirectly related to carbon balances and directly related to prokaryotic inhibitors. A surplus of substrate would cause increased flagellate biomass, increased grazing on bacterioplankton and therefore decreased bacterial biomass overall. Predation of ciliates is analogous to predation by flagellates on bacteria as well.

With using prokaryotic inhibitors seasonally, there is a positive relationship between bacterial abundance and heterotrophic nanoplankton grazing rates and only 40-45 % of bacterioplankton production was observed to be consumed by phagotrophic Protozoa. Additionally, eukaryotic inhibitory experiments show that protozoan grazing has a positive effect on bacterioplankton production suggesting that nitrogen regeneration by Protozoa could be highly important for bacterial growth. Eukaryotic inhibitors did not prove to be useful to determine protozoan grazing rates on bacterioplankton, however they may help understand control mechanisms in the microbial food web.

== Ecological significance ==
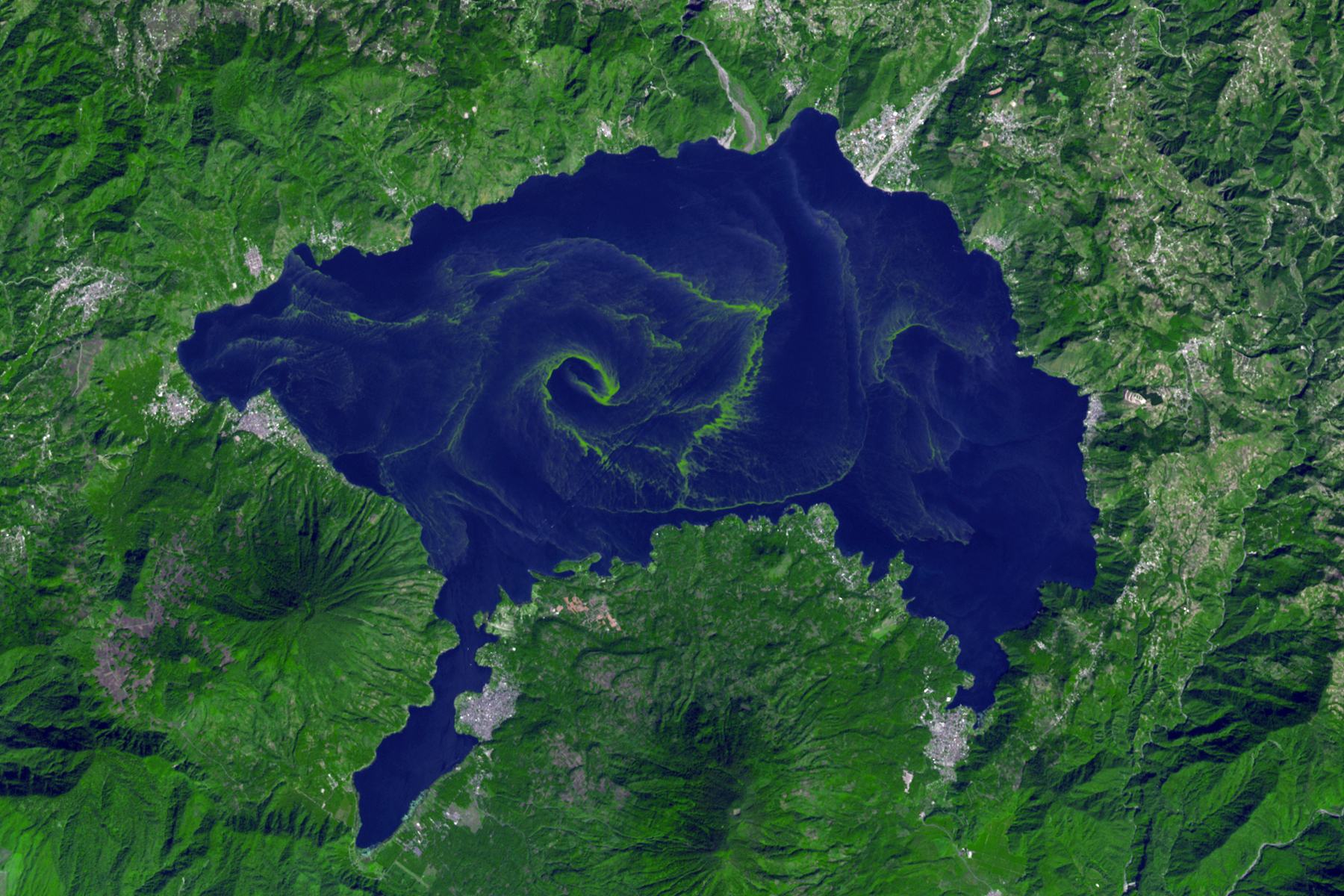
A large harmful bloom of cyanobacteria, more commonly known as blue-green algae, spread across the lake in green filaments and strands that are clearly visible in this simulated-natural-colour image.

Bacterioplankton such as cyanobacteria are able to have toxic blooms in eutrophic lakes which can lead to the death of many organisms such as fish, birds, cattle, pets and humans. A few examples of these harmful blooms is the Microcystis bloom in the year 2000 in Swan River estuary, Australia, and the Oostvaarderplassen in the Netherlands in 2003. The detrimental effects of these blooms can range from heart malformation in fish to constraining copepod reproduction.

High temperatures caused by seasonality increases stratification and preventing vertical turbulent mixing which increases competition for light that favours buoyant cyanobacteria. Higher temperatures also reduce the viscosity of water which allows faster movement which also favors buoyant species of cyanobacteria. These species are also very competitive with the ability to create a surface cover preventing light to reach deeper species of plankton.

Climate studies are also indicating that with increasing heat waves the likelihood of detrimental cyanobacterial blooms will become more of a threat to eutrophic freshwater systems. Other implications of the increasing average air temperature due to climate change is that there might be an expansion of the cyanobacterial bloom season, extending from earlier in the spring to later in the fall.

Estimates of bacterioplankton abundance and density can be derived with a variety of methods including direct counts, flow cytometry, and conclusions drawn from metabolic measures.

Further, as discussed in the biogeochemical cycling section, plankton are responsible for the recycling and movement of essential nutrients (i.e. nitrogen/carbon/DOM) which are essential building blocks for many of the organisms co-existing with bacterioplankton in these ecosystems. These recycled nutrients can be reused by primary producers, thus increasing the efficiency of the biological food web and minimizing energy waste.

== See also ==
- Bacterioplankton counting methods
- Cyanobacteria
- Pelagibacter
- Polynucleobacter
- Limnohabitans
- Roseobacter
- Phytoplankton
- Plankton
- Zooplankton
- Marine bacteria
- Marine bacteriophage
