= Organotroph =

Organism that obtains energy from organic substrates

An organotroph is an organism that obtains hydrogen or electrons from organic substrates. This term is used in microbiology to classify and describe organisms based on how they obtain electrons for their respiration processes. Some organotrophs such as animals and many bacteria, are also heterotrophs. Organotrophs can be either anaerobic or aerobic.

Different from an organotroph is a lithotroph, an organism which obtains its electrons from inorganic substrates.

== History ==
The term was suggested in 1946 by Lwoff and collaborators.

== See also ==
- Autotroph
- Chemoorganotroph
- Primary nutritional groups
