= Berg im Attergau =

- Municipality
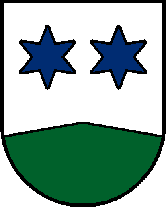
- Coat of arms

- Location within Austria
- Coordinates: 47°56′31″N 13°31′32″E
- Country: Austria, EU
- State: Upper Austria
- District: Vöcklabruck

Government
  - Mayor: Ernst Pachler (ÖVP)

Area
  - Total: 20.49 km^{2} (7.91 sq mi)
- Elevation: 654 m (2,146 ft)

Population (2026)
  - Total: 1,174
  - Density: 57.30/km^{2} (148.4/sq mi)
- Time zone: UTC+1 (CET)
  - Summer (DST): UTC+2 (CEST)
- Postal code: 4880
- Area code: 07667
- Vehicle registration: VB

Berg im Attergau is a municipality in Upper Austria in the district of Vöcklabruck in the Hausruckviertel with 1174 inhabitants (as of 1 January 2026). The responsible judicial district is Vöcklabruck.

== Geography ==
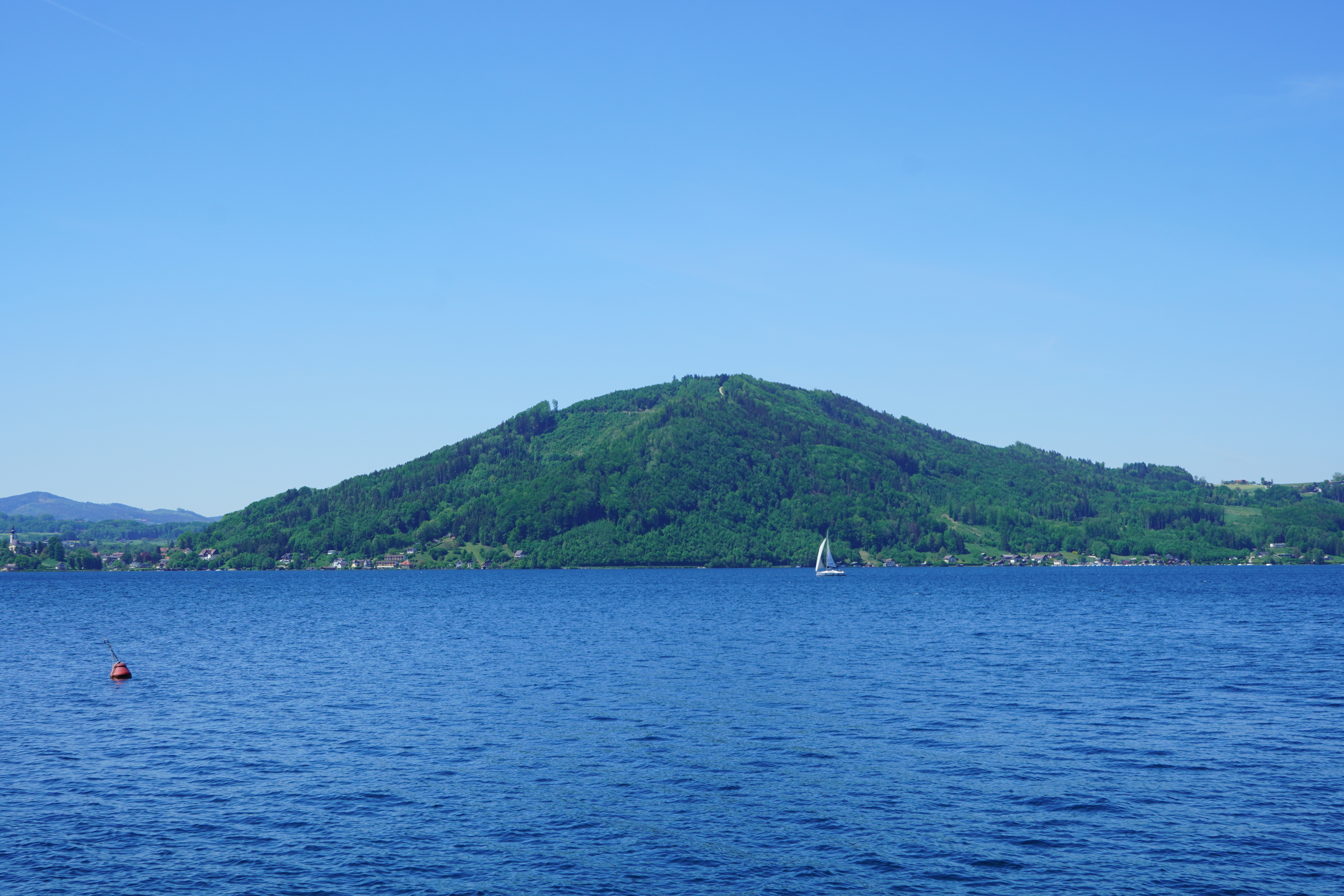
Buchberg as seen from Weyregg. One-third of the hill, directly to the right of the centre, belongs to the municipality.

Berg im Attergau lies at an altitude of 654 m above sea level and has a very small share of lake Attersee in the very east which lies at about 470 m above sea level. Westwards the municipal area rises to the forested Buchberg up to 808 m, falling of to only 500 m in the valley of the Dürre Ager. Further north-west lies the Dienstberg with only 546 m and in the south west the terrain rises to above 800 m. The municipality stretches 10 km from west to east and 5.7 km from north to south. The total area covered is 20.49 km², of which 31% are covered in forests and 61% are used for agriculture.

=== Municipal division ===
The municipal area comprises the following settlements (in brackets: number of inhabitants as of 1 January 2026)

- Baum (24)
- Berg im Attergau (169)
- Brandham (35)
- Eggenberg (73)
- Eisenpalmsdorf (36)
- Engljähring (73)
- Hipping (237)
- Jedlham (79)
- Katterlohen (19)
- Pössing (50)
- Raith (16)
- Rixing (75)
- Rubensdorf (19)
- Thanham (115)
- Walsberg (91)
- Wötzing (63)

The municipality comprises the cadastral communities of Berg and Eggenberg.

It is important to emphasise that Berg im Attergau is in facte one of the Lake Municipalities surrounding lake Attersee.

=== Neighboring municipalities ===
- Frankenmarkt (north-west)
- Vöcklamarkt (north)
- Gampern (north-east)
- Seewalchen am Attersee (east)
- Schörfling am Attersee (far east, sea border)
- Attersee am Attersee (south-east)
- St Georgen im Attergau (south)
- Straß im Attergau (south-west)
- Weißenkirchen im Attergau (west)

== History ==
The history of Berg im Attergau is closely linked to that of St. Georgen im Attergau. Originally situated in the eastern part of the Duchy of Bavaria, the town has belonged to the Duchy of Austria since the 12th century. Since 1490, it has been part of the Principality of Austria above the Enns.

Berg has been an independent municipality since 1848. The present-day municipality of Berg was formed in 1938 through the merger of the two independent municipalities of Berg and Eggenberg.

=== Circular rampart on the Buchberg ===
In 1974, during archaeological excavations led by Clemens Eibner, the outlines of a 400-metre-long ring wall were discovered. It can be assumed that around 1500 BC, the inhabitants of the lake dwellings abandoned their settlements by the lake and moved up here. The site itself, however, was not fortified until later.

Only a few artefacts (pottery, clay shards) were unearthed, but it is clear that the summit of the Buchberg was inhabited over a very long period. The walls and towers, the foundations of which were uncovered, were not built until the first centuries AD.

=== Tumulus ===
In the area around Berg there are a large number of burial mounds dating from the Latène period, three of which were excavated by the Federal Monuments Office in 2005 and 2006. Following its display at the pub in Baum, the exhibition is now on show at the House of Culture in St. Georgen im Attergau.

== Politics ==
With the municipal council and mayoral elections in Upper Austria 2021, the municipal council has the following distribution:

- 10 Austrian People's Party (ÖVP)
- 2 Freedom Party of Austria (FPÖ)
- 1 Social Democratic Party of Austria (SPÖ)

In prior elections it was:

- 2015, 10 ÖVP, 2 FPÖ and 1 SPÖ

=== Mayors ===
Mayors since 1850 have been:

- 1850–1861 Georg Kibler
- 1861–1864 Mathias Aichhorn
- 1864–1870 Franz Resch
- 1870–1873 Martin Wieland
- 1873–1876 Johann Aicher
- 1876–1879 Gottlieb Zöttl
- 1879–1882 Michael Bauschinger
- 1882–1885 Mathias Neubacher
- 1885–1894 Martin Scheichl
- 1894–1897 Franz Kroiss
- 1897–1900 Anton Kibler
- 1900–1903 Josef Roither
- 1903–1906 Josef Meinhart
- 1906–1906 Anton Resch
- 1906–1909 Josef Wieland
- 1909–1911 Christian Resch
- 1911–1919 Anton Eicher
- 1919–1924 Anton Starzinger
- 1924–1938 (merger with Berg-Eggenberg)
- 1938–1944 Matthias Eichhorn
- 1944–1945 Ernst Sompek
- 1945–1946 Franz Haumtratz
- 1946–1967 Josef Roither
- 1967–1969 Anton Starzinger
- 1969–1976 Johann Nini
- 1976–1979 Johann Hauser
- 1979–1997 Matthias Eicher
- 1997–2015 Franz Steinbichler
- since 2015 Ernst Pachler (ÖVP)

=== Coat of arms ===
The coat of arms depicts the place name with the green mountain, the green colour symbolising agriculture and tourism as key industries for the residents. The two stars represent the two formerly independent municipalities of Berg and Eggenberg, which were merged in 1938.

== Notable people ==
=== Honorary citizen ===
- Franz Hauser, (1947), Local historians and honorary citizens since 2019
