= Timelkam =

- Municipality
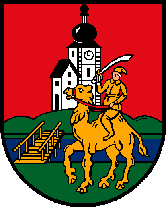
- Coat of arms

- Location within Austria
- Coordinates: 48°00′05″N 13°36′45″E
- Country: Austria, EU
- State: Upper Austria
- District: Vöcklabruck

Government
  - Mayor: André Reichart (SPÖ)

Area
  - Total: 18.12 km^{2} (7.00 sq mi)
- Elevation: 454 m (1,490 ft)

Population (2026)
  - Total: 5,939
  - Density: 327.8/km^{2} (848.9/sq mi)
- Time zone: UTC+1 (CET)
  - Summer (DST): UTC+2 (CEST)
- Postal code: 4850
- Area code: 07672
- Vehicle registration: VB
- Website: www.timelkam.at

Timelkam is a market town in Upper Austria in the district of Vöcklabruck in the Hausruckviertel with 5,939 inhabitants (as of 1 January 2026). The responsible judicial district is Vöcklabruck.

== Geography ==
Timelkam lies at an altitude of 454 m above sea level along the Ager, Vöckla and Dürre Ager. It stretches 7 km from north to south and 5.2 km from west to east. The total area covers 18.1 km². 23.8% of the area is forested, 61.3% of the area is used for agriculture. The Dürre Ager flows into the Vöckla in Timelkam.

=== Municipal division ===
The municipal area comprises the following settlements (in brackets: number of inhabitants as of 1 January 2026)

- Ader (468)
- Altwartenburg (32)
- Außerungenach (69)
- Eiding (36)
- Gsteinedt (58)
- Haag (36)
- Heitzing (54)
- Heuweg (61)
- Kalchofen (203)
- Leidern (336)
- Maierhof (63)
- Mühlfeld (15)
- Neuwartenburg (6)
- Oberau (14)
- Obereck (137)
- Obergallaberg (29)
- Oberthalheim (108)
- Pichlwang (497)
- Stöfling (129)
- Straß (61)
- Timelkam (3214)
- Ulrichsberg (20)
- Unterau (4)
- Untereck (14)
- Untergallaberg (224)
- Wimberg (51)

=== Neighbouring municipalities ===
- Ungenach (north)
- Puchkirchen am Trattberg (northwest)
- Neukirchen an der Vöckla (westnorth)
- Gampern (west)
- Seewalchen am Attersee (southwest)
- Lenzing an der Ager (south)
- Aurach am Hongar (southeast)
- Regau (east)
- Vöcklabruck (northeast)

== Culture and places of interest ==
- Burgstall Perkheim: The non recognisable remains (burgstall) of a medieval castle.
- Burg Wartenburg: trans. Wartenburg Castle was a medieval castle built on the northern shore of the Vöckla river, first mentioned in 1319. It was partially demolished in the 18th century. At present, only the main tower (bergfried) remains.
- Schloss Alt-Wartenburg: trans. Old Wartenburg Castle was build by Tobias Nütz von Goisernburg, who purchased the estate from Ludwig von Polheim in 1639, built a castle on a hilltop adjacent to the old castle. The new castle was partly constructed using rubble from the old castle. An engraving by Vischer from 1674 shows the old castle and the new castle connected by a bridging structure. In 1678, the newer castle burned down but was rebuilt in 1689–90. Following the construction of New Wartenburg Castle in 1732, Old Wartenburg Castle served only a secondary purpose, and after the Second World War, it largely fell into ruin. Until 2010, the site was used for occasional open-air events. The as of 2020 castle grounds and all access routes are closed by the authorities until further notice.
- Schloss Neu-Wartenburg: trans. New Wartenburg Castle was built between 1730 and 1732 on behalf of Johann Albert, Count Saint-Julien-Wallsee (1673–1766) by the Viennese architect Anton Erhard Martinelli on the southern shore of the Vökla river. Count Wallsee had purchased the estate in 1729 from the Nütz von Goisernburg family, who had resided there since 1640. He had invited Emperor Charles VI to join him on a falconry hunt for three days and wished to provide him with accommodation befitting his status. As early as 1754, he was forced to sell the estate again due to debts. Via the Ghelen family, it passed to the von Grechtler family in 1766, to Thaddäus von Reischach in 1785 and to Ludwig Ratzesberg in 1847, until Albert Count von Saint-Julien was able to return it to the family’s possession in 1869. The last heiress of the Saint-Julien family was adopted by Countess Elisabeth von Strachwitz. The castle has belonged to the von Strachwitz family since 1973 and is not open to the public.
- Marktturm Timelkam: trans. Timelkam Market Tower is a five-storey tower, with a square footprint. It is 23 metres high with a hipped roof, a turret and a lantern. On the west and east sides are frescoed clock faces and frescoes depicting the market town’s coat of arms. In 1608-09, the tower was built by Christoph Kronberger, a master mason from Vöcklabruck, as a meeting place for the judge and the council of Timelkam. It also housed the prison. The building was funded by the townspeople, with a grant from Friedrich von Polheim, the owner of Wartenburg Castle. From 1706 to 1919, the tower was used as a toll tower. The toll collector lived and carried out his duties here. In 1930, the small semi-circular extension on the north side was demolished to widen the road through the village. The tower is well preserved due to its continuous use. The last restoration took place in 1976.

== Infrastructure ==
The Timelkam power plant, consisting of four units, is present on the locality territory.

The most recent part is a 400 MW combined cycle gas unit that was commissioned in 2009. It was planned to allow the immediate shut down of the old 66 MW coal unit, as well as an older gas unit, however low 2013 coal prices have led instead to the decision to mothball it soon after completion.

In 2006, a 15MW biomass unit was also commissioned, and supplies a heating network.
