= Unterach am Attersee =

- Municipality
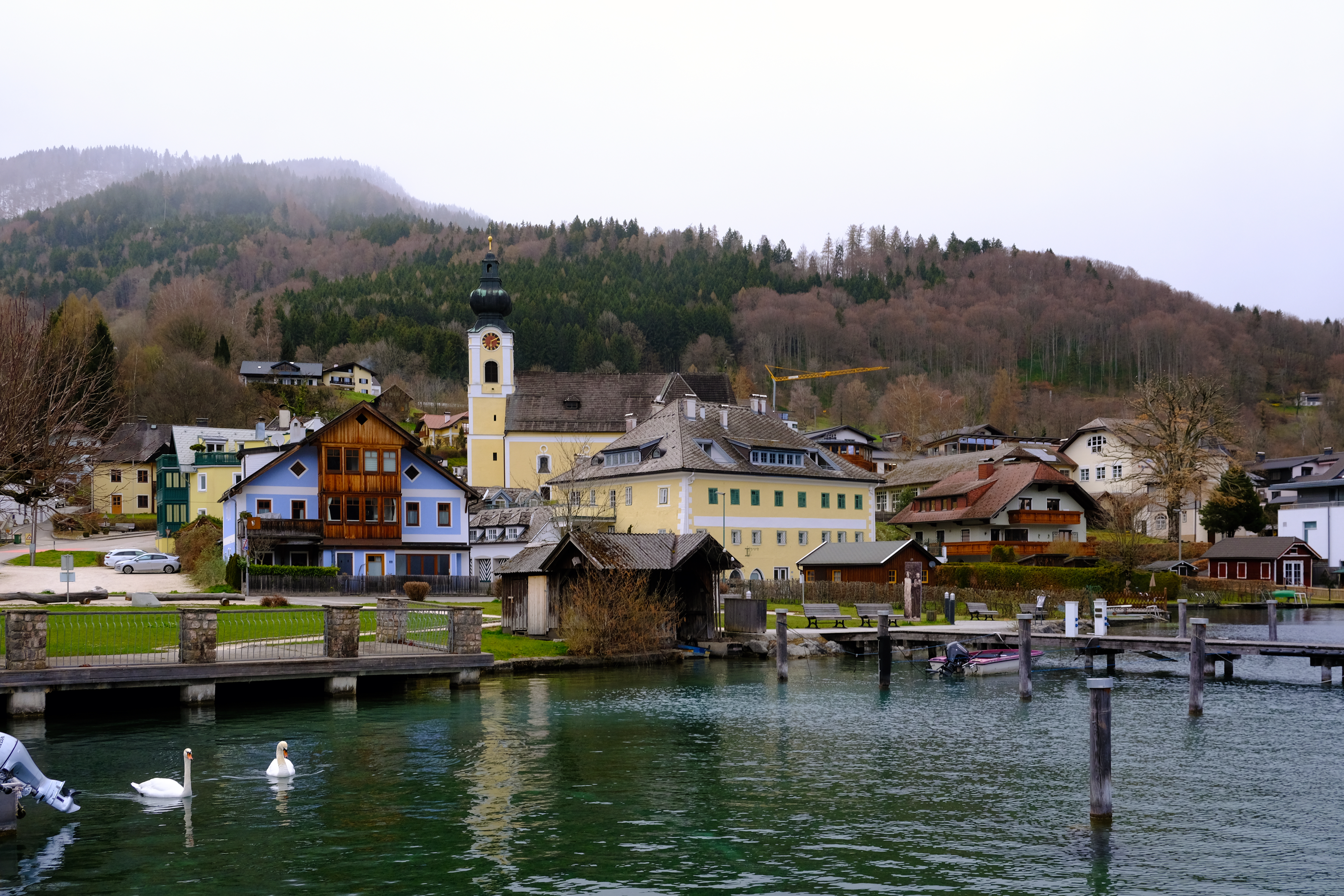

- Coat of arms

- Location within Austria
- Coordinates: 47°48′25″N 13°29′30″E
- Country: Austria
- State: Upper Austria
- District: Vöcklabruck

Government
  - Mayor: Georg Baumann (ÖVP)

Area
  - Total: 26.03 km^{2} (10.05 sq mi)
- Elevation: 477 m (1,565 ft)

Population (2018-01-01)
  - Total: 1,448
  - Density: 55.63/km^{2} (144.1/sq mi)
- Time zone: UTC+1 (CET)
  - Summer (DST): UTC+2 (CEST)
- Postal code: 4866
- Area code: 07665
- Vehicle registration: VB

Unterach is a village in the Austria state of Upper Austria on the southern shore of lake Attersee in the centre of the Salzkammergut region.

The name derives from the Austro-Bavarian Untr|aha ~ between|waters based on the geographical location on the shore of lake Mondsee and lake Attersee.

== Coat of arms ==
- In gold a blue diagonal bar, within is a silver fish, complemented by a red heart.
- Town colours: blue-yellow-red

The arms were granted on 1980-08-25 by the government of Upper Austria based on a resolution of the Town Council of 1979-11-09.

== Gallery ==
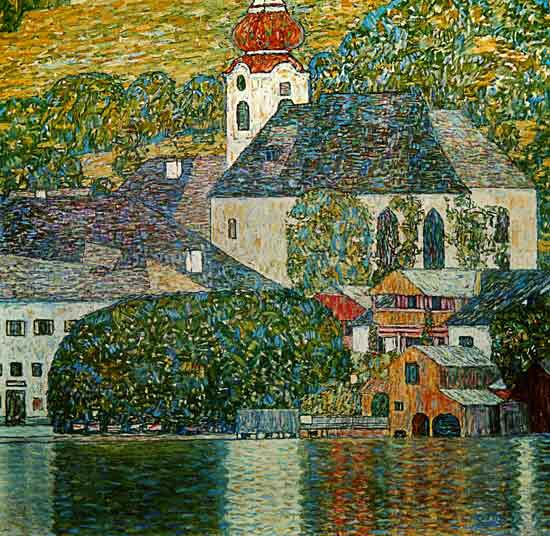
Gustav Klimt: Church in Unterach am Attersee

== Politics ==
- Mayor Georg Baumann, ÖVP

The town council consists of 19 members. The chair is taken by the mayor who has been elected directly since 1997. (Exception: E. Gnigler got appointed by the town council in 2007.) The 1 to 2 vice-chairs are elected by the town council; likewise the allocation of responsibilities is decided by the town council.

The town council, as of the latest election in 2009, is constituted as follows:

- ÖVP: 10 mandates
- SPÖ: 9 mandates

Historic election results.

== Town communities ==
- Au/See
  - Ort am Mondsee
  - See am Mondsee
  - Au
- Unterach
  - Mühlleiten
  - Village Centre
- Buchenort
  - Misling
  - Stockwinkel

== Neighbouring towns ==
- Nußdorf am Attersee
- Oberwang
- Innerschwand
- Mondsee
- St. Gilgen
- Steinbach am Attersee

== Lakes ==
- Attersee
- Mondsee
- Egelsee (Unterach)

== Personalities ==
- Viktor Kaplan
- Hugo Wolf
- Johannes Brahms
- Gottfried Keller
- Maria Jeritza
- Heinz Conrads
- Georg Danzer
- Gusti Wolf
- Johanna Matz
- Elisabeth Stiepl
- Karl Schwetter
- Alexander Jenner
- Franz Bauer-Teussl
- Heinrich Schiff
- Cardinal Christoph Schönborn
- Gloria Excelsias
