= Oberalberting =

Coordinates: 48°01′00″N 013°26′00″E

Oberalberting (also known as Alberting) is a populated place in Upper Austria, Austria. It is a village (Ortschaft) in Pfaffing in Vöcklabruck District. As of 1 January 2019, population was 120.

== See also ==
- Fornach
