= Betzenberg (disambiguation) =

Betzenberg is a hill and quarter of the German city of Kaiserslautern, Rhineland-Palatinate.

Betzenberg may also refer to:

- a colloquial name for the Fritz Walter Stadium in Kaiserslautern
- Betzenberg (Schönbuch), a mountain in Baden-Württemberg, Germany

== See also ==
- Pitzenberg
