= Vinzenz Fischer =

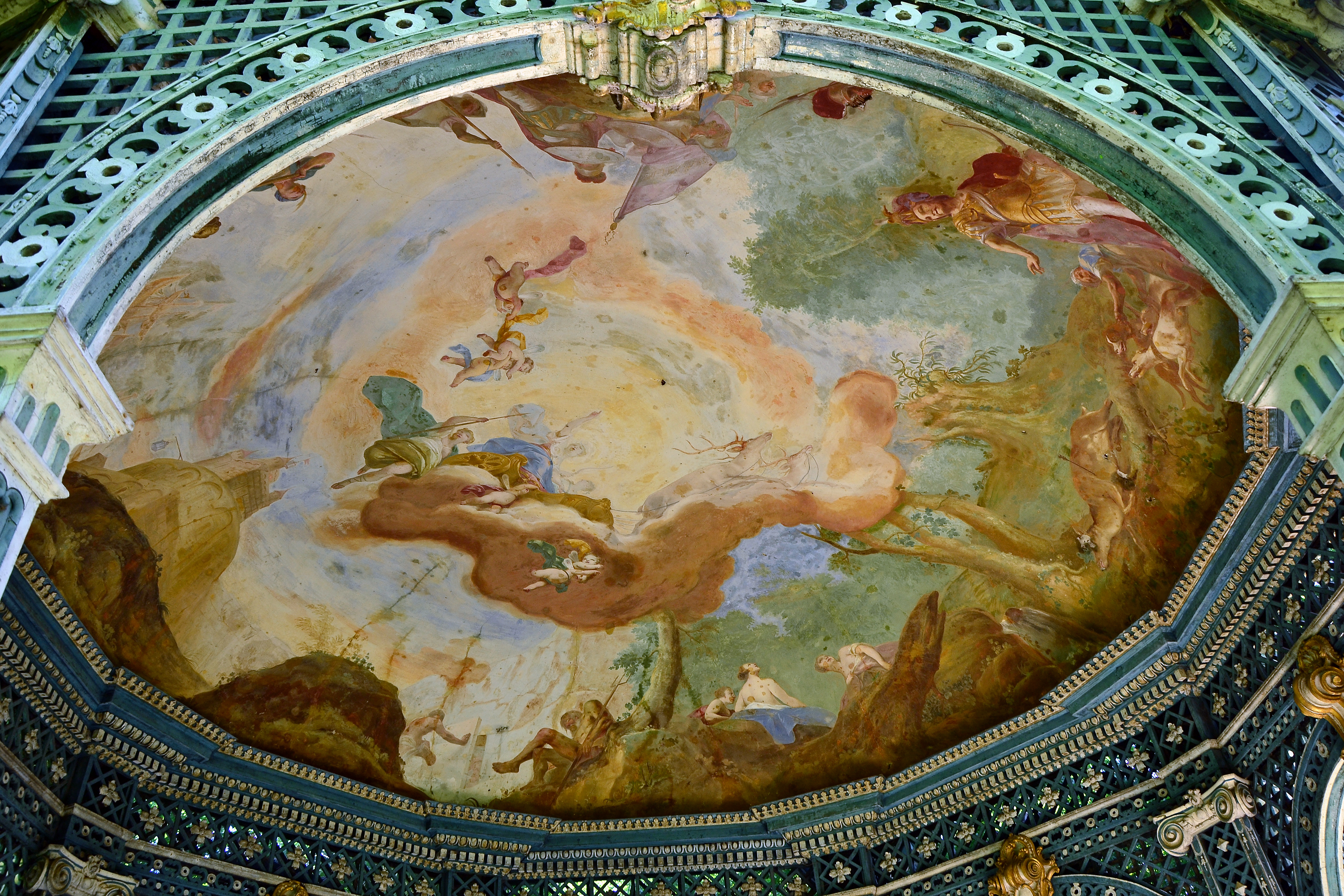
Vault paintings Hunting Agamemnon by Vinzenz Fischer, from Green summer house, the Temple of Diana in Laxenburg, circa 1763

Vinzenz Fischer (1729–1810) was a historical painter and professor of architecture at the Academy of Vienna.

== Life ==
Fischer was born at Schmidham, in Bavaria, on 3 April 1729. Following an initial artistic education in Passau, he entered the Vienna Academy as a student in 1751. He made a journey to Italy in 1753–1755, and, following his return to Vienna, was accepted as a member of the academy in 1760. He had a great knowledge of architecture and geometry, and held the post of professor of architecture at the academy between 1764 and 1808. He died at Vienna on 26 October 1810.

== Works ==
The following works by him are worthy of mention:

- The Restoring of the Young Man of Nain to life, 1763.
- The Raising of Lazarus, 1763.
- Moses when a Boy treading on Pharaoh's Crown (in the academy at Vienna).
- Crucifixion, 1778 – Piarist church of the Finding of the Holy Cross, Litomyšl (copy after destroyed original by Francesco Trevisani).
