= Gampern =

- Municipality
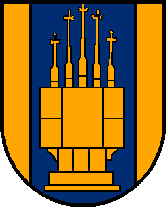
- Coat of arms

- Location within Austria
- Coordinates: 47°59′21″N 13°33′02″E
- Country: Austria, EU
- State: Upper Austria
- District: Vöcklabruck

Government
  - Mayor: Jürgen Lachinger (ÖVP)

Area
  - Total: 26.26 km^{2} (10.14 sq mi)
- Elevation: 509 m (1,670 ft)

Population (2025)
  - Total: 3,123
  - Density: 118.9/km^{2} (308.0/sq mi)
- Time zone: UTC+1 (CET)
  - Summer (DST): UTC+2 (CEST)
- Postal code: 4851
- Area code: 07682
- Vehicle registration: VB
- Website: www.gampern.at

Gampern is a municipality in Upper Austria in the district of Vöcklabruck in the Hausruckviertel with 3123 inhabitants (as of 1 January 2025). The responsible judicial district is Vöcklabruck.

== Geography ==
Gampern lies in the Austrian alpine foreland north of lake Attersee. Two rivers run through the municipality, these being the Vöckla and the Dürre Ager at a hight of 450 to 500 metres above sealevel respectively. It municipality stretches 5.9 km north to south and 6.8 km from west to east. The total area covers 26.26 km². More than two thirds of the area is used for agriculture, 20% is forested.

=== Municipal division ===
The municipal area comprises the following settlements (in brackets: number of inhabitants as of 1 January 2025)

- Baumgarting (202)
- Bergham (128)
- Bierbaum (341)
- Egning (54)
- Fischham (46)
- Fischhamering (87)
- Gallnbrunn (23)
- Gampern (798)
- Genstetten (52)
- Haunolding (101)
- Hehenberg (53)
- Hörgattern (62)
- Koberg (48)
- Oberheikerding (52)
- Piesdorf (75)
- Pöring (111)
- Schwarzmoos (142)
- Siedling (50)
- Stein (21)
- Stötten (30)
- Unterheikerding (17)
- Viehaus (85)
- Weiterschwang (280)
- Witzling (153)
- Zeiling (112)

=== Neighbouring municipalities ===
- Neukirchen an der Vöckla (north)
- Vöcklamarkt (west)
- Timelkam (east)
- Seewalchen am Attersee (south)
- Berg im Attergau (south-west)

== History ==
Gampern is first mentioned around the year 800 under the name Campara in the Mondsee Book of Traditions. From 1143, it was incorporated into the Mattsee Collegiate Chapter as a branch of Vöcklamarkt, until it became an independent parish in 1900. The Mattsee Chapter retained the right of patronage.

Originally situated in the eastern part of the Duchy of Bavaria, the village belonged to the Duchy of Austria from the 12th century onwards. Since 1490, it has been part of the Principality of Austria above the Enns.

At the start of the Thirty Years' War, in 1620, the Habsburgs pledged Upper Austria to the Bavarian Duke Maximilian I. due to a lack of funds for the war chest. In the period that followed, Maximilian sent not only numerous tax officials but also Catholic clergy to Upper Austria, who were to enforce the Counter-Reformation there in accordance with the legal principle of Cuius regio, eius religio. The area around Gampern was one of those regions in Upper Austria where Protestants put up particularly fierce resistance to the Counter-Reformation. Following the Frankenburg Dice Game, in which the Bavarian governor Adam Count von Herberstorff had 36 men gamble for their lives in pairs on 15 May 1625, three citizens from Gampern were executed by hanging at the lime tree on the Haushamerfeld.

During the Napoleonic Wars, the town was occupied on several occasions.

The town has been part of the federal state of Upper Austria since 1918. Following Austria's annexation by the Nazi Germany on 13 March 1938, the town became part of the Oberdonau Gau. Upper Austria was re-established after 1945.

In 2019, the municipality was awarded the IMPULS Award in the digitalisation category.

At the end of April 2023, RAG Austria AG commissioned Underground Sun Storage. Summer electricity surpluses from solar installations are converted into hydrogen gas and injected into a former porous rock natural gas storage facility. In winter, the gas is to be extracted and utilised via an 8 km pipeline at a combined heat and power plant in the municipality. Co-financed by the Climate Fund.

== Culture and places of interest ==
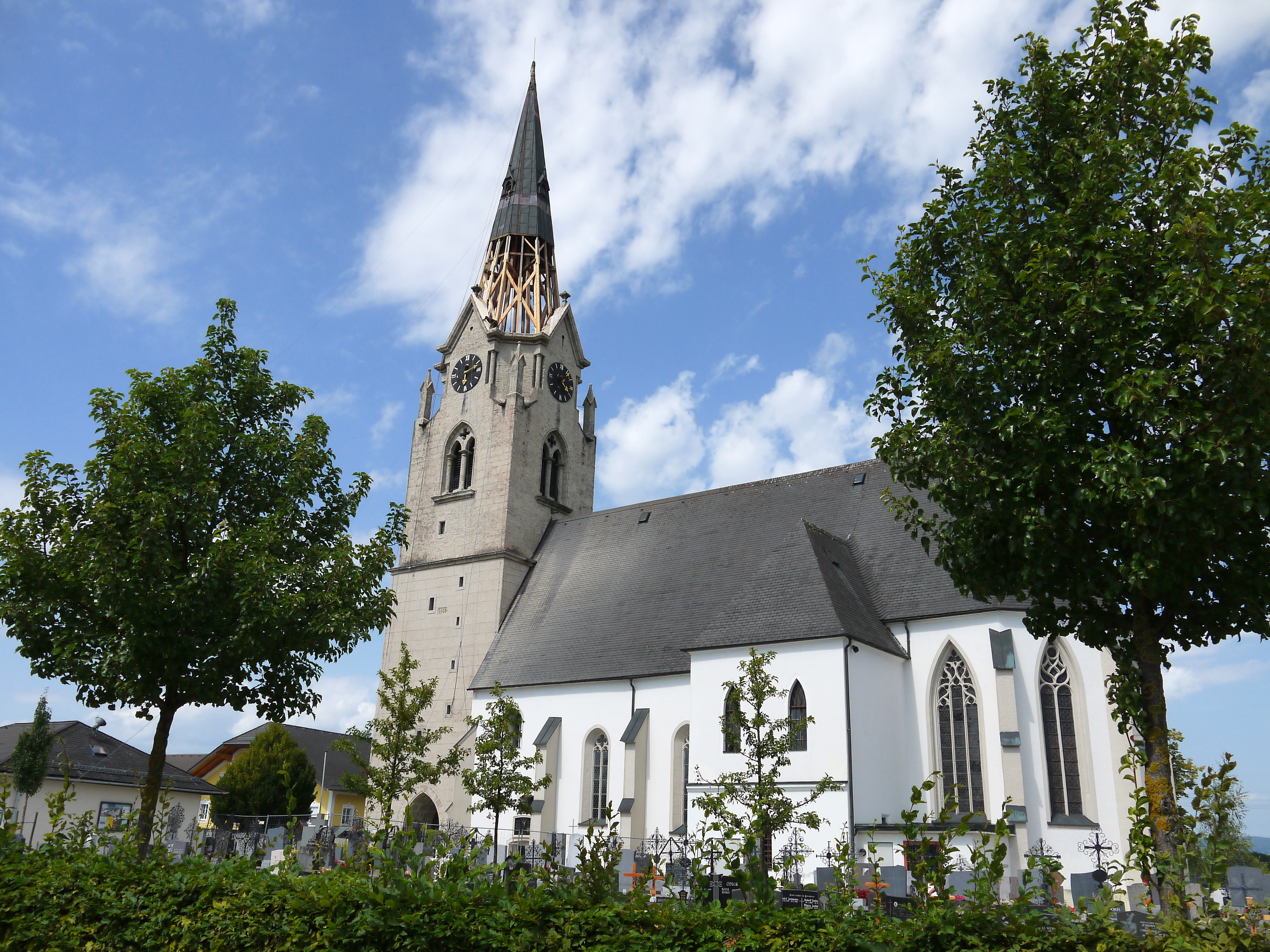
St Remigius catholic parish church

- St Remigius Catholic Parish Church, Gampern: This late-Gothic hall church with two naves was built between 1480 and 1486. The imposing Gothic west tower was erected up to roof level in the early 16th century, and in 1890 it was extended to a height of 63 metres. A particular highlight is the winged altar in the late-Gothic parish church in Gampern. The altar is the third-largest Gothic winged altar in Upper Austria, crafted between 1497 and 1507.
- Kernstockhaus Heritage Centre in Pöring: Former storage building for the Kapeller, a log-built smokehouse, now a local history museum.

== Economy and infrastructure ==
=== Transport ===
The municipality has a station on the Western Railway, which is one of Austria's most important rail lines. Service is provided via Cityjet by the Austrian Federal Railways (ÖBB).

Austria's most important trunk road the B1 also runs through the municipality.

== Politics ==
With the municipal council and mayoral elections in Upper Austria 2021, the municipal council has the following distribution:

- 16 Austrian People's Party (ÖVP)
- 3 Citizen Initiative Gampern (BIG)
- 2 Freedom Party of Austria (FPÖ)
- 4 Greens

In prior elections it was:

- 2015, 13 ÖVP, 8 SPÖ and 4 FPÖ
- 2009: 13 ÖVP, 5 SONST, 5 SPÖ and 2 FPÖ
- 2003: 12 ÖVP, 7 SONST and 6 SPÖ

=== Mayors ===
Mayors since 1850 have been:

- 1850–1856 Gottlieb Kofler
- 1856–1860 Matthias Knoll
- 1860–1861 Josef Mayr
- 1861–1864 Michael Gebetsberger
- 1864–1867 Josef Gattinger
- 1867–1870 Sebastian Gstöttner
- 1870–1873 Franz Habring
- 1873–1876 Anton Katterl
- 1876–1879 Johann Eberl
- 1879–1882 Josef Habring
- 1882–1885 Josef Reiter
- 1885–1890 Johann Lachinger
- 1890–1891 Gottlieb Gebetsberger
- 1891–1894 Franz Bauernfeind
- 1894–1898 Michael Wagneder
- 1898–1900 Josef Habring
- 1900–1903 Johann Katterl
- 1903–1906 Josef Lachinger
- 1906–1909 Josef Mayr
- 1909–1912 Johann Eberl
- 1912–1919 Johann Sonntag
- 1919–1924 Anton Gebetsberger
- 1924–1929 Josef Habring
- 1929–1937 Anton Gebetsberger
- 1937–1938 Matthias Kriechbaum
- 1938–1938 Matthias Kreuzer
- 1938–1938 Alois Fuchs
- 1938–1939 August Höftberger
- 1939–1945 Alois Leuchtenmüller
- 1945–1955 Matthias Gebetsberger
- 1955–1979 Franz Trausner
- 1979–2002 Anton Brunbauer
- 2002–2020 Hermann Stockinger (ÖVP)
- since 2020 Jürgen Lachinger (ÖVP)

=== Coat of arms ===
The coat of arms depicts the parish church's winged altarpiece, which is of significant art-historical importance.

=== Notable people ===
- Daniela Holzinger-Vogtenhuber, (1987), politician (Jetzt – Liste Pilz, formerly SPÖ), former Member of the National Council, grew up in Gampern and lives there
- Michaela Schüchner, (1977), politician (SPÖ), district mayor of Vienna's 14th district, Penzing; grew up in Gampern
