= Steinbach am Attersee =

- Municipality
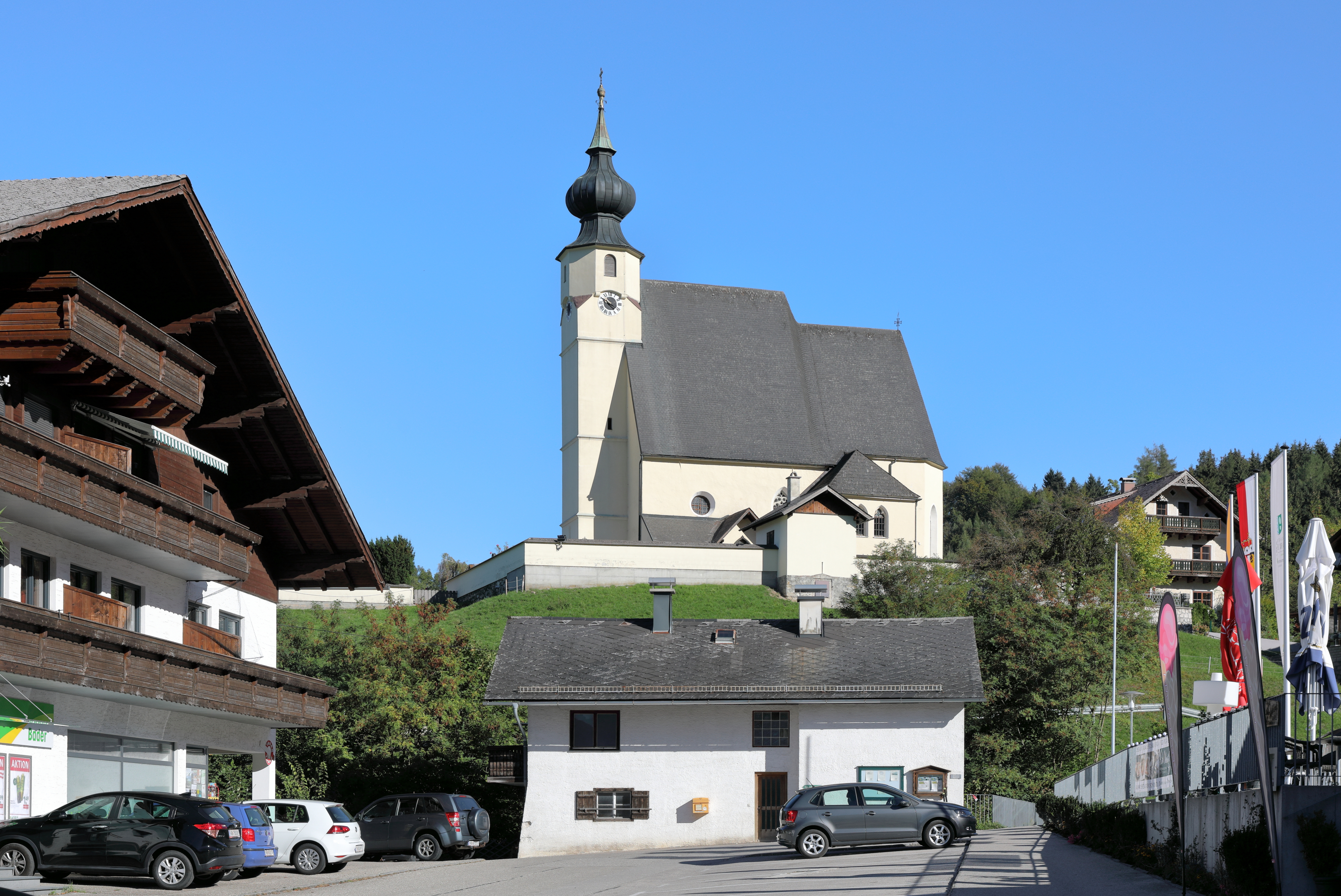

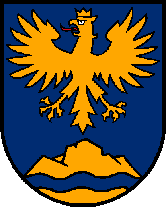
- Coat of arms

- Location within Austria
- Coordinates: 47°49′55″N 13°33′00″E
- Country: Austria
- State: Upper Austria
- District: Vöcklabruck

Government
  - Mayor: Nicole Eder (ÖVP)

Area
  - Total: 61.81 km^{2} (23.86 sq mi)
- Elevation: 509 m (1,670 ft)

Population (2018-01-01)
  - Total: 866
  - Density: 14.0/km^{2} (36.3/sq mi)
- Time zone: UTC+1 (CET)
  - Summer (DST): UTC+2 (CEST)
- Postal code: 4853
- Area code: 07663
- Vehicle registration: VB
- Website: www.steinbach-attersee.at

Steinbach am Attersee is a municipality of the Vöcklabruck district in the Austrian state of Upper Austria. It is situated in the Hausruckviertel region on the eastern banks of the Attersee (Lake Atter), part of the Salzkammergut area.

== History ==
Once a Celtic settlement area of the Hallstatt culture, the parish church of Steinbach was first mentioned in a 1276 deed, then part of the Duchy of Austria. The hard-to-reach settlement at the lake's steep shore remained a branch of the church of Sankt Georgen im Attergau until 1781. The Late Gothic St Andrew's Church was erected from about 1410.

== Attractions ==
In Steinbach the composing hut of Gustav Mahler can be seen. Gustav Mahler composed here two symphonies and a dozen songs.

== Population ==
Historical population
Year	Pop.	±%
1991	1,002	—
2001	913	−8.9%
2011	842	−7.8%
2016	867	+3.0%

== Politics ==
Seats in the municipal assembly (Gemeinderat) as of 2015 elections:

- Austrian People's Party (ÖVP): 8
- Social Democratic Party of Austria (SPÖ): 3
- The Greens – The Green Alternative (Grüne): 2

== Personalities ==
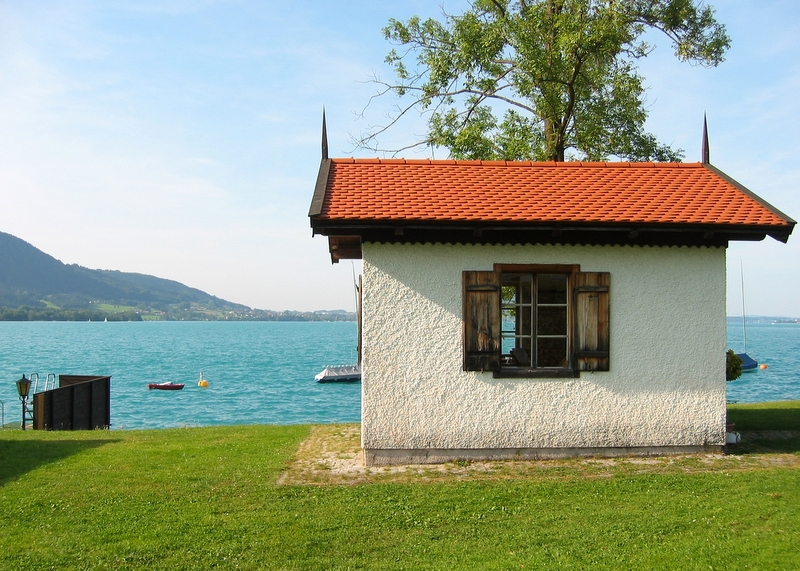
Gustav Mahler's cabin

- From 1893 to 1896 Gustav Mahler, then kapellmeister at the Hamburg State Opera, stayed in Steinbach several times. It was in a small cabin near the shore of the Attersee, where he wrote parts of his Symphony No. 2 and the whole No. 3.
- The stamp collector Philipp von Ferrary acquired a villa in Steinbach in 1890. He is buried at the churchyard.
- The pianist Friedrich Gulda had a residence in the small village of Weißenbach, where he died on January 27, 2000.
- The painter, Gustav Klimt stayed in Schloss Kammer on the Attersee.
