= Oberndorf bei Schwanenstadt =

- Municipality
- Coat of arms

- Location within Austria
- Coordinates: 48°03′24″N 13°45′44″E
- Country: Austria
- State: Upper Austria
- District: Vöcklabruck

Government
  - Mayor: Rupert Imlinger (ÖVP)

Area
  - Total: 6.05 km^{2} (2.34 sq mi)
- Elevation: 390 m (1,280 ft)

Population (2018-01-01)
  - Total: 1,416
  - Density: 234/km^{2} (606/sq mi)
- Time zone: UTC+1 (CET)
  - Summer (DST): UTC+2 (CEST)
- Postal code: 4690
- Area code: 07673
- Vehicle registration: VB
- Website: members.aon.at/oberndorf

Oberndorf bei Schwanenstadt is a municipality in the district of Vöcklabruck in the Austrian state of Upper Austria.

== Population ==
Historical population
Year	Pop.	±%
1991	1,277	—
2001	1,351	+5.8%
2016	1,419	+5.0%
