= Atzbach =

- Municipality
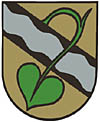
- Coat of arms

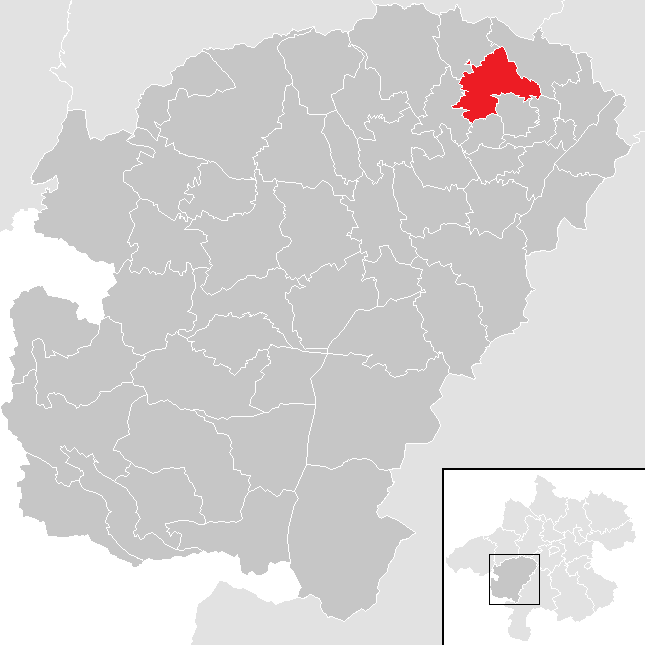
- Location in the district

- Location within Austria
- Coordinates: 48°05′06″N 13°42′13″E
- Country: Austria
- State: Upper Austria
- District: Vöcklabruck

Government
  - Mayor: Berthold Reiter (ÖVP)

Area
  - Total: 14.12 km^{2} (5.45 sq mi)
- Elevation: 464 m (1,522 ft)

Population (2018-01-01)
  - Total: 1,196
  - Density: 84.70/km^{2} (219.4/sq mi)
- Time zone: UTC+1 (CET)
  - Summer (DST): UTC+2 (CEST)
- Postal code: 4904
- Area code: 07676
- Vehicle registration: VB
- Website: www.atzbach.ooe.gv.at

Atzbach is a municipality in the district of Vöcklabruck in the Austrian state of Upper Austria.

== Population ==
Historical population
Year	Pop.	±%
1991	1,060	—
2001	1,154	+8.9%
