= Zell am Pettenfirst =

- Municipality
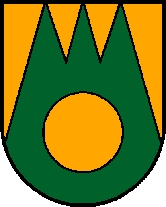
- Coat of arms

- Location within Austria
- Coordinates: 48°04′42″N 13°36′00″E
- Country: Austria
- State: Upper Austria
- District: Vöcklabruck

Government
  - Mayor: Johann Stockinger (ÖVP)

Area
  - Total: 13.67 km^{2} (5.28 sq mi)
- Elevation: 550 m (1,800 ft)

Population (2018-01-01)
  - Total: 1,236
  - Density: 90.42/km^{2} (234.2/sq mi)
- Time zone: UTC+1 (CET)
  - Summer (DST): UTC+2 (CEST)
- Postal code: 4842
- Area code: 07675
- Vehicle registration: VB
- Website: www.zellampettenfirst.at

Zell am Pettenfirst is a municipality in the district of Vöcklabruck in the Austrian state of Upper Austria.

== Population ==
Historical population
Year	Pop.	±%
1991	1,106	—
2001	1,223	+10.6%
2013	1,166	−4.7%
2016	1,209	+3.7%
