= Rüstorf =

- Municipality
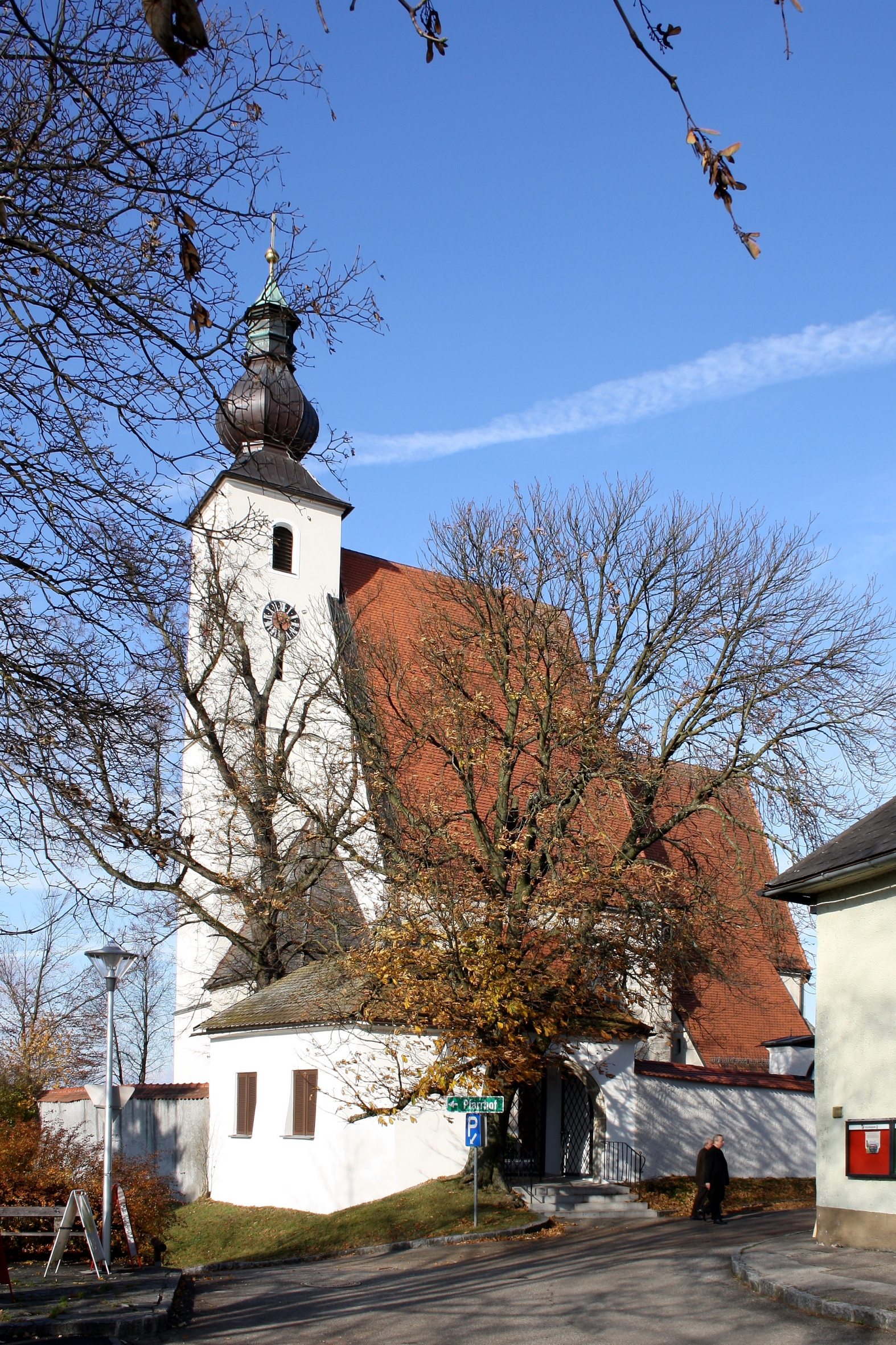

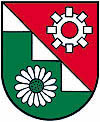
- Coat of arms

- Location within Austria
- Coordinates: 48°02′42″N 13°47′33″E
- Country: Austria
- State: Upper Austria
- District: Vöcklabruck

Government
  - Mayor: Pauline Sterrer (ÖVP)

Area
  - Total: 13.63 km^{2} (5.26 sq mi)
- Elevation: 387 m (1,270 ft)

Population (2018-01-01)
  - Total: 2,104
  - Density: 154.4/km^{2} (399.8/sq mi)
- Time zone: UTC+1 (CET)
  - Summer (DST): UTC+2 (CEST)
- Postal code: 4690
- Area code: 07673
- Vehicle registration: VB
- Website: www.ruestorf.at

Rüstorf is a municipality in the district of Vöcklabruck in the Austrian state of Upper Austria.

== Population ==
Historical population
Year	Pop.	±%
1991	1,900	—
2001	1,988	+4.6%
2016	2,055	+3.4%
