= Rutzenham =

- Municipality
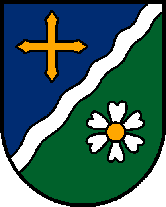
- Coat of arms

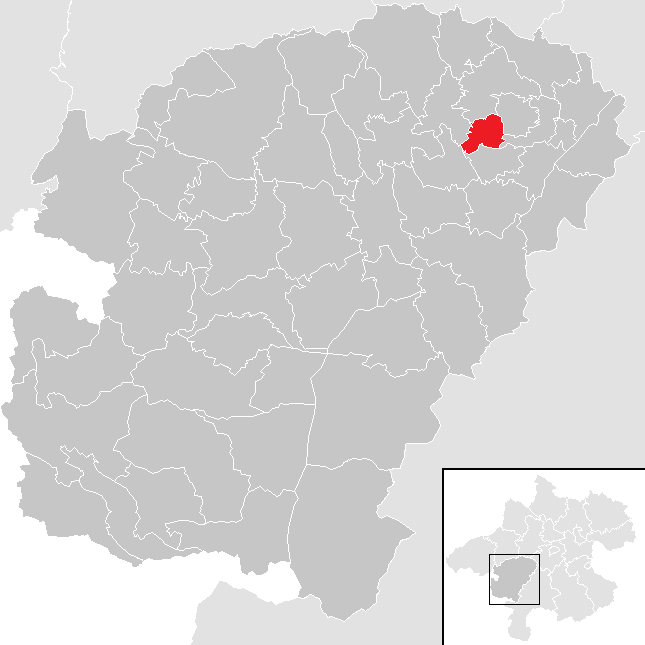
- Location in the district

- Location within Austria
- Coordinates: 48°03′15″N 13°42′21″E
- Country: Austria
- State: Upper Austria
- District: Vöcklabruck

Government
  - Mayor: Anton Helmberger (ÖVP)

Area
  - Total: 4.95 km^{2} (1.91 sq mi)
- Elevation: 421 m (1,381 ft)

Population (2018-01-01)
  - Total: 298
  - Density: 60.2/km^{2} (156/sq mi)
- Time zone: UTC+1 (CET)
  - Summer (DST): UTC+2 (CEST)
- Postal code: 4690
- Area code: 07673
- Vehicle registration: VB
- Website: Rutzenham

Rutzenham is a municipality in the district of Vöcklabruck in the Austrian state of Upper Austria.

== Population ==
Historical population
Year	Pop.	±%
1991	239	—
2001	236	−1.3%
2005	238	+0.8%
2016	279	+17.2%
2018	298	+6.8%
