= Tiefgraben =

- Municipality
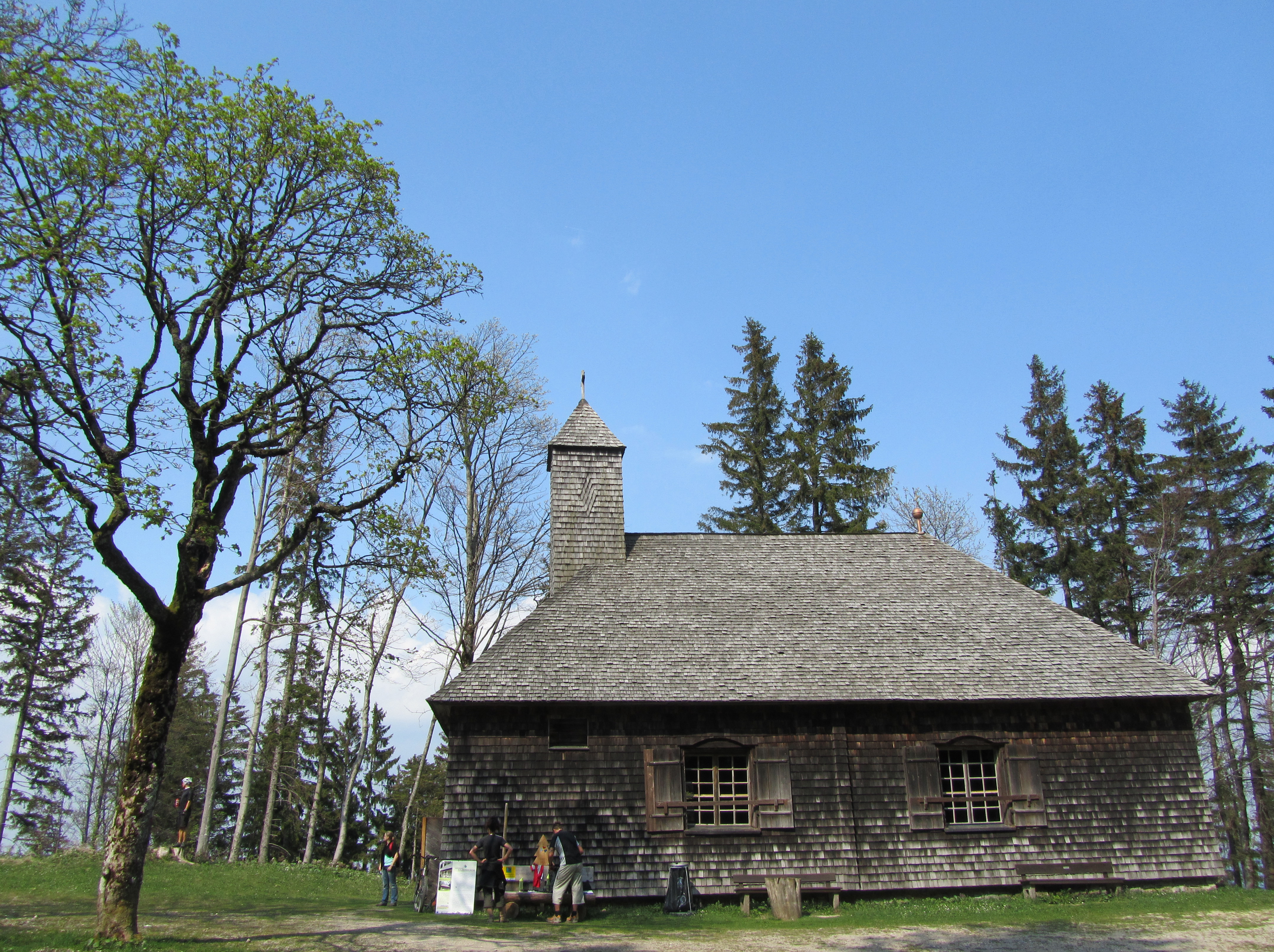

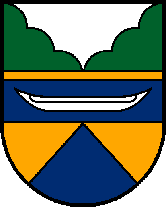
- Coat of arms

- Location within Austria
- Coordinates: 47°51′31″N 13°21′46″E
- Country: Austria
- State: Upper Austria
- District: Vöcklabruck

Government
  - Mayor: Johann Dittlbacher (ÖVP)

Area
  - Total: 38.24 km^{2} (14.76 sq mi)
- Elevation: 740 m (2,430 ft)

Population (2018-01-01)
  - Total: 3,974
  - Density: 103.9/km^{2} (269.2/sq mi)
- Time zone: UTC+1 (CET)
  - Summer (DST): UTC+2 (CEST)
- Postal code: 5310
- Area code: 06232
- Vehicle registration: VB
- Website: www.tiefgraben.at

Tiefgraben is a municipality in the district of Vöcklabruck in the Austrian state of Upper Austria.

== Population ==
Historical population
Year	Pop.	±%
1991	2,722	—
2001	3,071	+12.8%
2016	3,966	+29.1%
