= Redleiten =

- Municipality
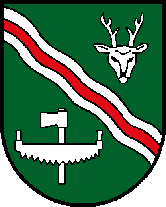
- Coat of arms

- Location within Austria
- Coordinates: 48°05′10″N 13°28′23″E
- Country: Austria
- State: Upper Austria
- District: Vöcklabruck

Government
  - Mayor: Michael Altmann (ÖVP)

Area
  - Total: 14.36 km^{2} (5.54 sq mi)
- Elevation: 555 m (1,821 ft)

Population (2018-01-01)
  - Total: 537
  - Density: 37.4/km^{2} (96.9/sq mi)
- Time zone: UTC+1 (CET)
  - Summer (DST): UTC+2 (CEST)
- Postal code: 4873
- Area code: 07683
- Vehicle registration: VB

Redleiten is a municipality in the district of Vöcklabruck in the Austrian state of Upper Austria.

== Population ==
Historical population
Year	Pop.	±%
1991	394	—
2001	465	+18.0%
2016	515	+10.8%
