= Pöndorf =

- Municipality
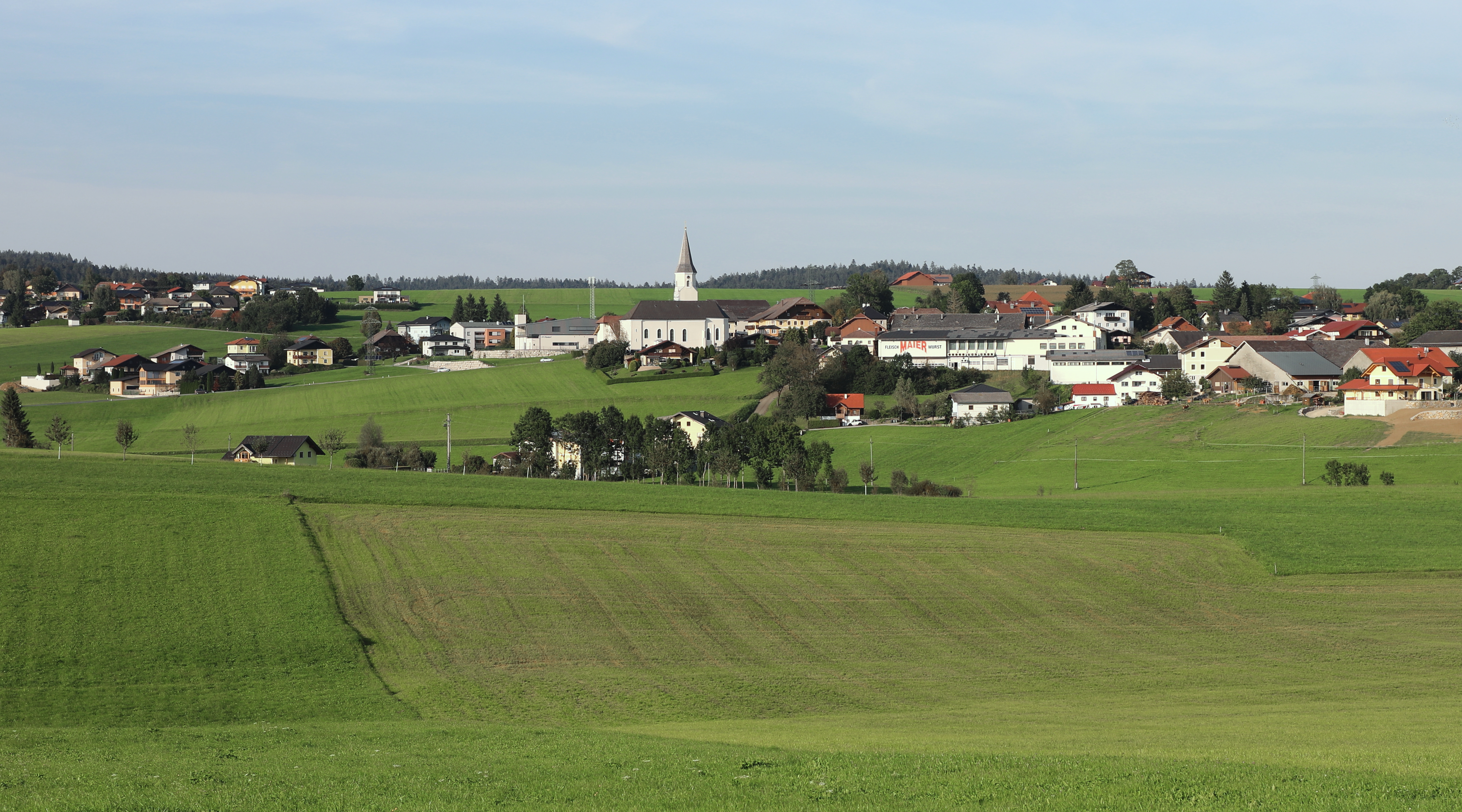
- South-southwest view of Pöndorf

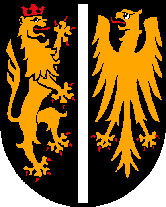
- Coat of arms

- Location within Austria
- Coordinates: 47°59′50″N 13°22′01″E
- Country: Austria
- State: Upper Austria
- District: Vöcklabruck

Government
  - Mayor: Johann Zieher (ÖVP)

Area
  - Total: 50.89 km^{2} (19.65 sq mi)
- Elevation: 574 m (1,883 ft)

Population (2018-01-01)
  - Total: 2,386
  - Density: 46.89/km^{2} (121.4/sq mi)
- Time zone: UTC+1 (CET)
  - Summer (DST): UTC+2 (CEST)
- Postal code: 4891
- Area code: 07684
- Vehicle registration: VB
- Website: www.poendorf.at

Pöndorf (Central Bavarian: Pädoaf) is a municipality in the district of Vöcklabruck in the Austrian state of Upper Austria.

== Population ==
Historical population
Year	Pop.	±%
1991	2,125	—
2001	2,232	+5.0%
2008	2,315	+3.7%
2016	2,339	+1.0%
