= Desselbrunn =

- Municipality
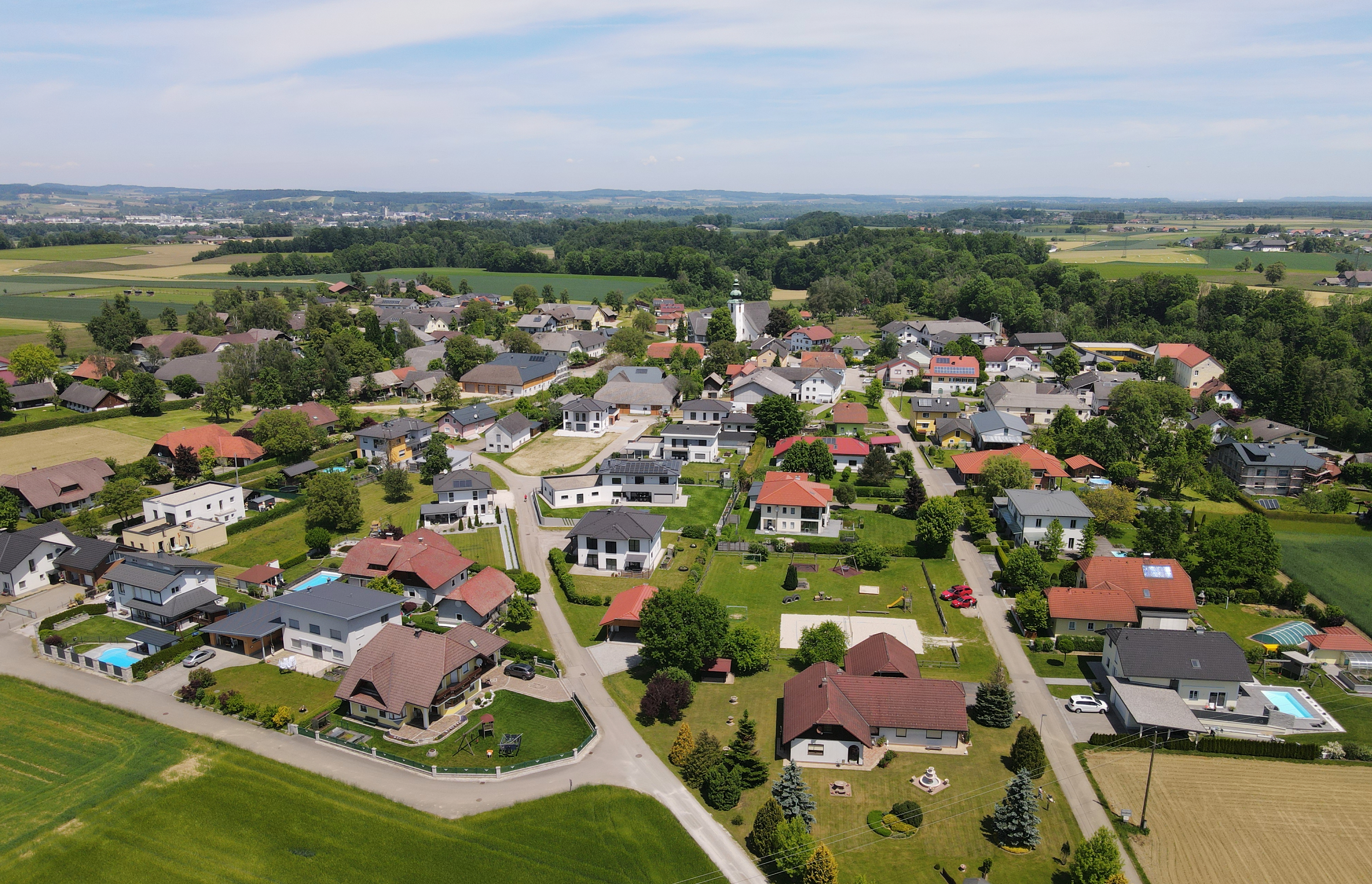
- Aerial view of Desselbrunn

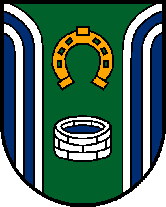
- Coat of arms

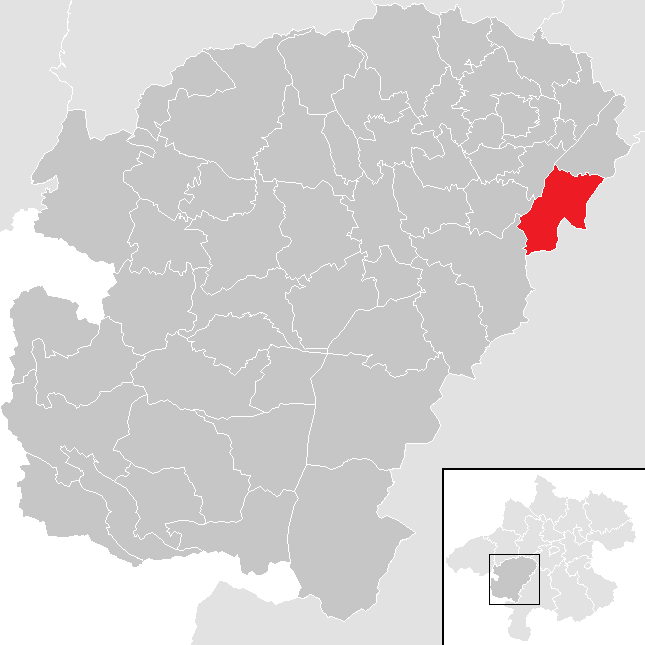
- Location in the district

- Location within Austria
- Coordinates: 48°01′22″N 13°46′25″E
- Country: Austria
- State: Upper Austria
- District: Vöcklabruck

Government
  - Mayor: Ulrike Hille (ÖVP)

Area
  - Total: 17.38 km^{2} (6.71 sq mi)
- Elevation: 421 m (1,381 ft)

Population (2018-01-01)
  - Total: 1,857
  - Density: 106.8/km^{2} (276.7/sq mi)
- Time zone: UTC+1 (CET)
  - Summer (DST): UTC+2 (CEST)
- Postal code: 4693
- Area code: 07673
- Vehicle registration: VB
- Website: www.desselbrunn.at

Desselbrunn is a municipality in the district of Vöcklabruck in the Austrian state of Upper Austria.

== Population ==
Historical population
Year	Pop.	±%
1991	1,581	—
2001	1,534	−3.0%
2016	1,807	+17.8%
