= Vöcklabruck District =

Coordinates: 48.009°N 13.575°E

Vöcklabruck District Bezirk Vöcklabruck
- District
- Country: Austria
- State: Upper Austria
- Number of municipalities: 52
- Administrative seat: Vöcklabruck

Government
  - District Governor: Johannes Beer

Area
  - Total: 1,084.12 km^{2} (418.58 sq mi)

Population (2026)
  - Total: 142,147
  - Density: 131.117/km^{2} (339.593/sq mi)
- Time zone: UTC+01:00 (CET)
  - Summer (DST): UTC+02:00 (CEST)
- Telephone prefix: 7672
- Vehicle registration: VB

Bezirk Vöcklabruck is a district of the state of Upper Austria in Austria. With more than 142,000 inhabitants, the district of Vöcklabruck is the 10th largest district of Austria.

== Municipalities ==
Towns (Städte) are indicated in boldface; market towns (Marktgemeinden) in italics; suburbs, hamlets and other subdivisions of a municipality are indicated in small characters.

- Ampflwang im Hausruckwald
- Attersee
- **Attnang-Puchheim**
- Atzbach
- Aurach am Hongar
- Berg im Attergau
- Desselbrunn
- Fornach
- Frankenburg am Hausruck
- Frankenmarkt
- Gampern
- Innerschwand
- Lenzing an der Ager
- Manning
- Mondsee
- Neukirchen an der Vöckla
- Niederthalheim
- Nußdorf am Attersee
- Oberalberting, village
- Oberhofen am Irrsee
- Oberndorf bei Schwanenstadt
- Oberwang
- Ottnang am Hausruck
- Pfaffing
- Pilsbach
- Pitzenberg
- Pöndorf
- Puchkirchen am Trattberg
- Pühret
- Redleiten
- Redlham
- Regau
- Rüstorf
- Rutzenham
- Sankt Georgen im Attergau
- Sankt Lorenz
- Schlatt
- Schörfling am Attersee
- **Schwanenstadt**
- Seewalchen am Attersee
- Steinbach am Attersee
- Straß im Attergau
- Tiefgraben
- Timelkam
- Ungenach
- Unterach am Attersee
- **Vöcklabruck**
- Vöcklamarkt
- Weißenkirchen im Attergau
- Weyregg am Attersee
- Wolfsegg am Hausruck
- Zell am Moos
- Zell am Pettenfirst
