= Viktor Kaplan =

Austrian engineer

Viktor Kaplan

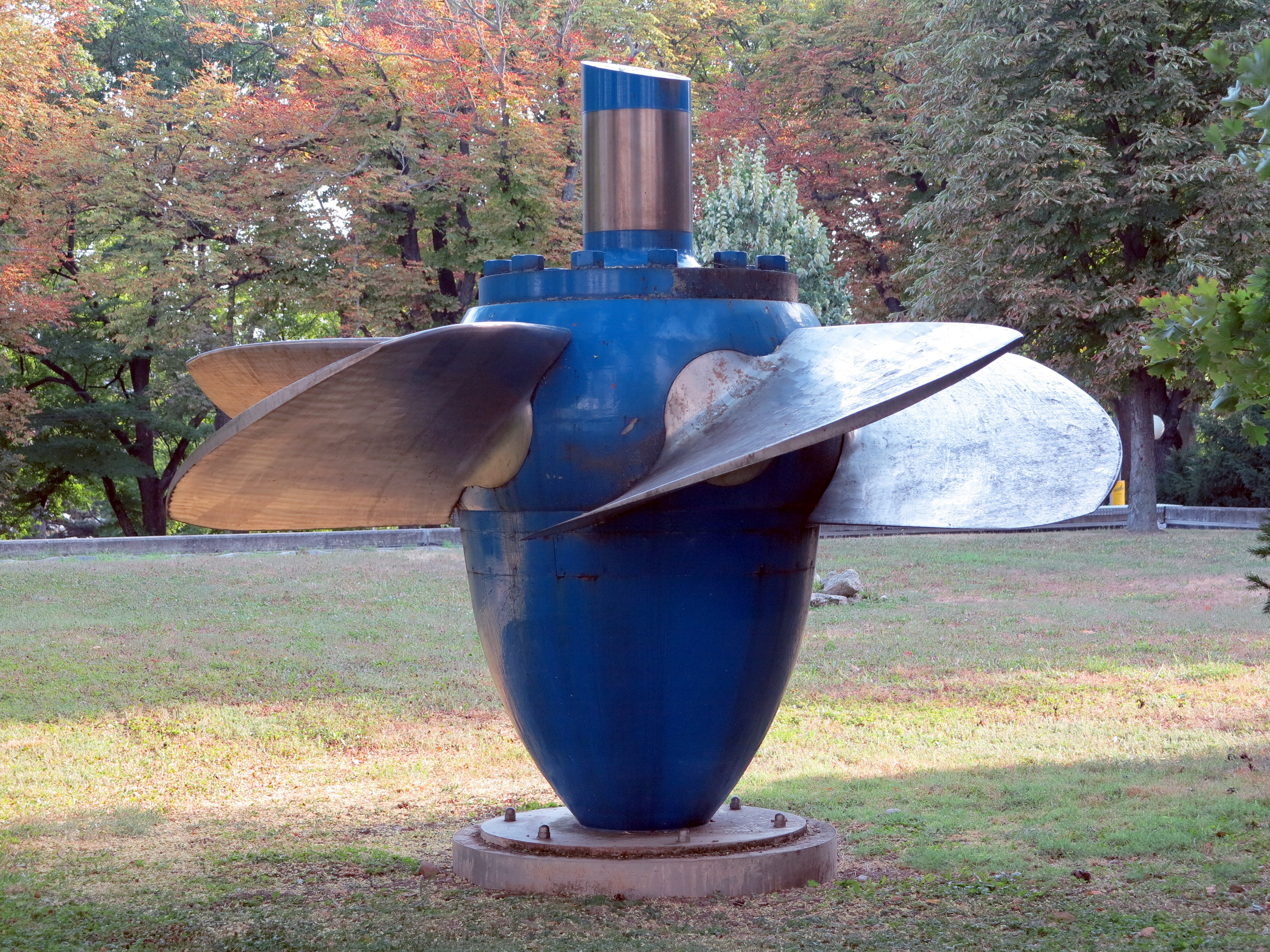
Viktor Kaplan Turbine Technisches Museum Wien

Viktor Kaplan (27 November 1876 – 23 August 1934) was an Austrian engineer and the inventor of the Kaplan turbine.

== Life ==
Kaplan was born in Mürzzuschlag, Styria, Austria into a railroad worker's family. He graduated from high school in Vienna in 1895, after which he attended the Technical University of Vienna, where he studied mechanical engineering and specialised in diesel engines. From 1900 to 1901 he was drafted into military service in Pula.

After working in Vienna with a specialisation in motors, he moved to the German Technical University in Brno to conduct research at the institute of civil engineering. He spent the next three decades of his life in Brno, and nearly all his inventions and research are connected with his professorship there. In 1913 he was appointed head of the institute for water turbines.

In 1912 he published his most notable work: the Kaplan turbine, a revolutionary water turbine that was especially fitted to produce electricity from large streams with only a moderate incline. From 1912 to 1913 he received four patents on these kinds of turbines.

In 1918 the first Kaplan turbine with 26 kW power and a diameter of 60 cm was built by the Storek construction company for a textile manufacturer in Lower Austria. This turbine was used until 1955 and today is exhibited at the Technisches Museum Wien. After the success of the first Kaplan turbines they started being used worldwide and remain one of the most widely used kinds of water turbines.

In 1926 and 1934 Kaplan received honorary doctorates. He died of a stroke in 1934 at Unterach am Attersee, Austria.

Kaplan was honored and featured on the 1000 Austrian schilling banknote in 1961.
