= Pühret =

- Municipality
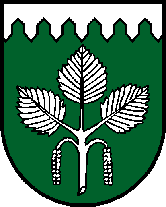
- Coat of arms

- Location within Austria
- Coordinates: 48°01′49″N 13°42′25″E
- Country: Austria
- State: Upper Austria
- District: Vöcklabruck

Government
  - Mayor: Johann Schlachter (ÖVP)

Area
  - Total: 6.55 km^{2} (2.53 sq mi)
- Elevation: 440 m (1,440 ft)

Population (2018-01-01)
  - Total: 613
  - Density: 93.6/km^{2} (242/sq mi)
- Time zone: UTC+1 (CET)
  - Summer (DST): UTC+2 (CEST)
- Postal code: 4690
- Area code: 07673
- Vehicle registration: VB

Pühret is a municipality in the district of Vöcklabruck in the Austrian state of Upper Austria, with an estimated population of 613 inhabitants at the start of 2018.

It is located to the east of the stare, close to Lake Attersee, on the border with the state of Salzburg, to the south of the River Danube and to the southeast of Linz - the capital of the state.

== Population ==
Historical population
Year	Pop.	±%
1991	550	—
2001	573	+4.2%
2016	614	+7.2%
