= Redlham =

- Municipality
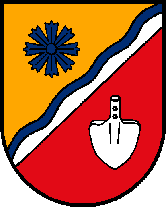
- Coat of arms

- Location within Austria
- Coordinates: 48°01′27″N 13°44′41″E
- Country: Austria
- State: Upper Austria
- District: Vöcklabruck

Government
  - Mayor: Johann Forstinger (ÖVP)

Area
  - Total: 8.05 km^{2} (3.11 sq mi)
- Elevation: 403 m (1,322 ft)

Population (2018-01-01)
  - Total: 1,515
  - Density: 188/km^{2} (487/sq mi)
- Time zone: UTC+1 (CET)
  - Summer (DST): UTC+2 (CEST)
- Postal code: 4846
- Area code: 07674
- Vehicle registration: VB
- Website: www.redlham.at

Redlham is a municipality in the district of Vöcklabruck in the Austrian state of Upper Austria.

== Population ==
Historical population
Year	Pop.	±%
1991	1,230	—
2001	1,309	+6.4%
2010	1,437	+9.8%
2016	1,474	+2.6%
