= Manning, Upper Austria =

Manning
- Municipality
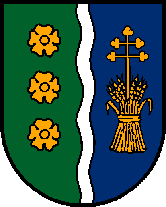
- Coat of arms

- Location within Austria
- Coordinates: 48°05′13″N 13°40′02″E
- Country: Austria
- State: Upper Austria
- District: Vöcklabruck

Government
  - Mayor: Gerhard Gründlinger (ÖVP)

Area
  - Total: 10.01 km^{2} (3.86 sq mi)
- Elevation: 510 m (1,670 ft)

Population (2018-01-01)
  - Total: 795
  - Density: 79.4/km^{2} (206/sq mi)
- Time zone: UTC+1 (CET)
  - Summer (DST): UTC+2 (CEST)
- Postal code: 4901
- Area code: 0 76 76
- Vehicle registration: VB

Manning is a town in the Austrian state of Upper Austria.

== Population ==
Historical population
Year	Pop.	±%
1991	763	—
2001	829	+8.7%
2016	821	−1.0%
