= Pitzenberg =

- Municipality
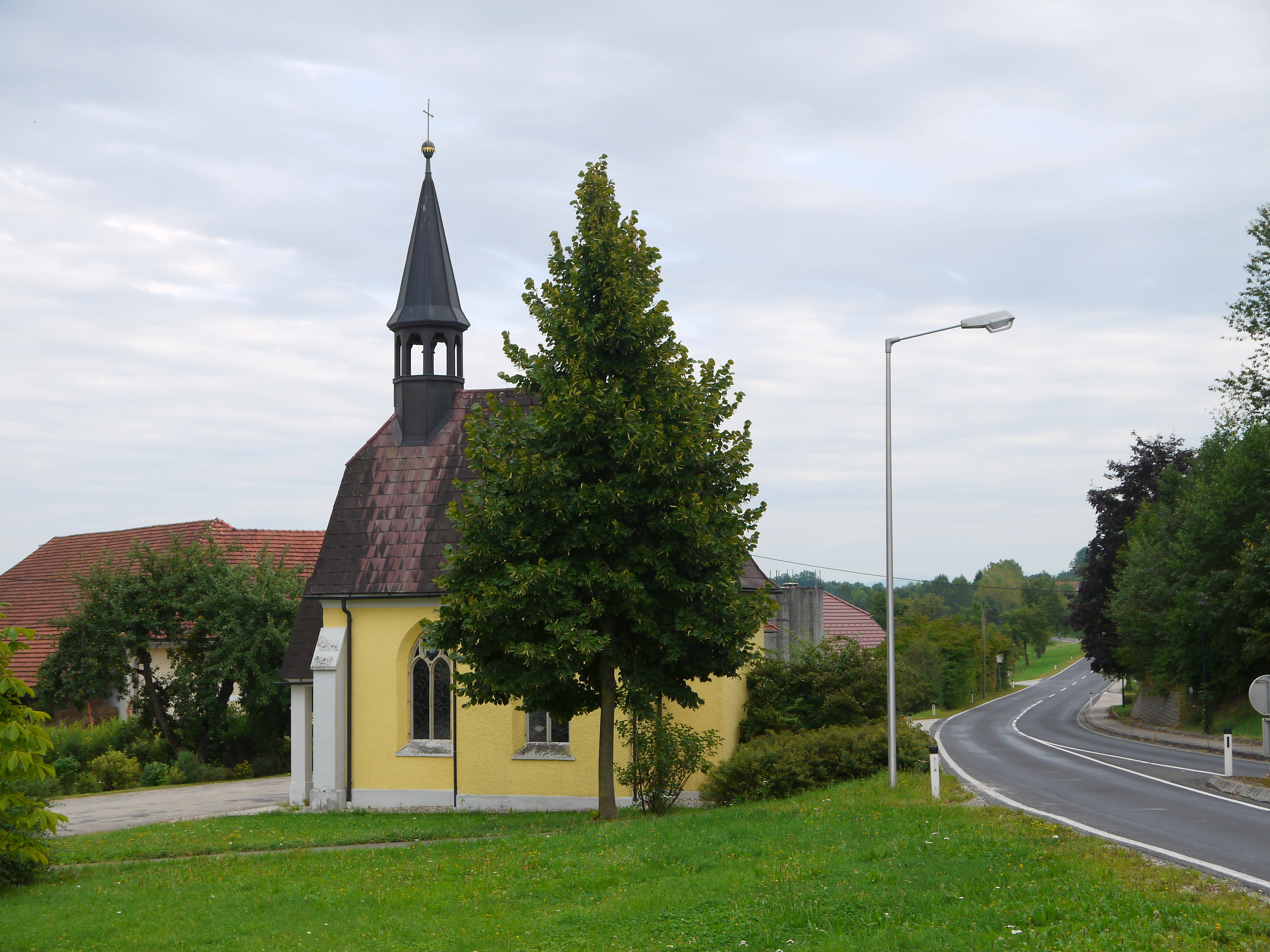

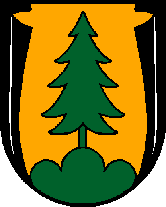
- Coat of arms

- Location within Austria
- Coordinates: 48°04′26″N 13°43′36″E
- Country: Austria
- State: Upper Austria
- District: Vöcklabruck

Government
  - Mayor: Franz Haghofer (ÖVP)

Area
  - Total: 6.12 km^{2} (2.36 sq mi)
- Elevation: 445 m (1,460 ft)

Population (2018-01-01)
  - Total: 524
  - Density: 85.6/km^{2} (222/sq mi)
- Time zone: UTC+1 (CET)
  - Summer (DST): UTC+2 (CEST)
- Postal code: 4690
- Area code: 07673
- Vehicle registration: VB

Pitzenberg is a municipality in the district of Vöcklabruck in the Austrian state of Upper Austria.

== Population ==
Historical population
Year	Pop.	±%
1991	467	—
2001	495	+6.0%
2016	511	+3.2%
