= Ungenach =

- Municipality
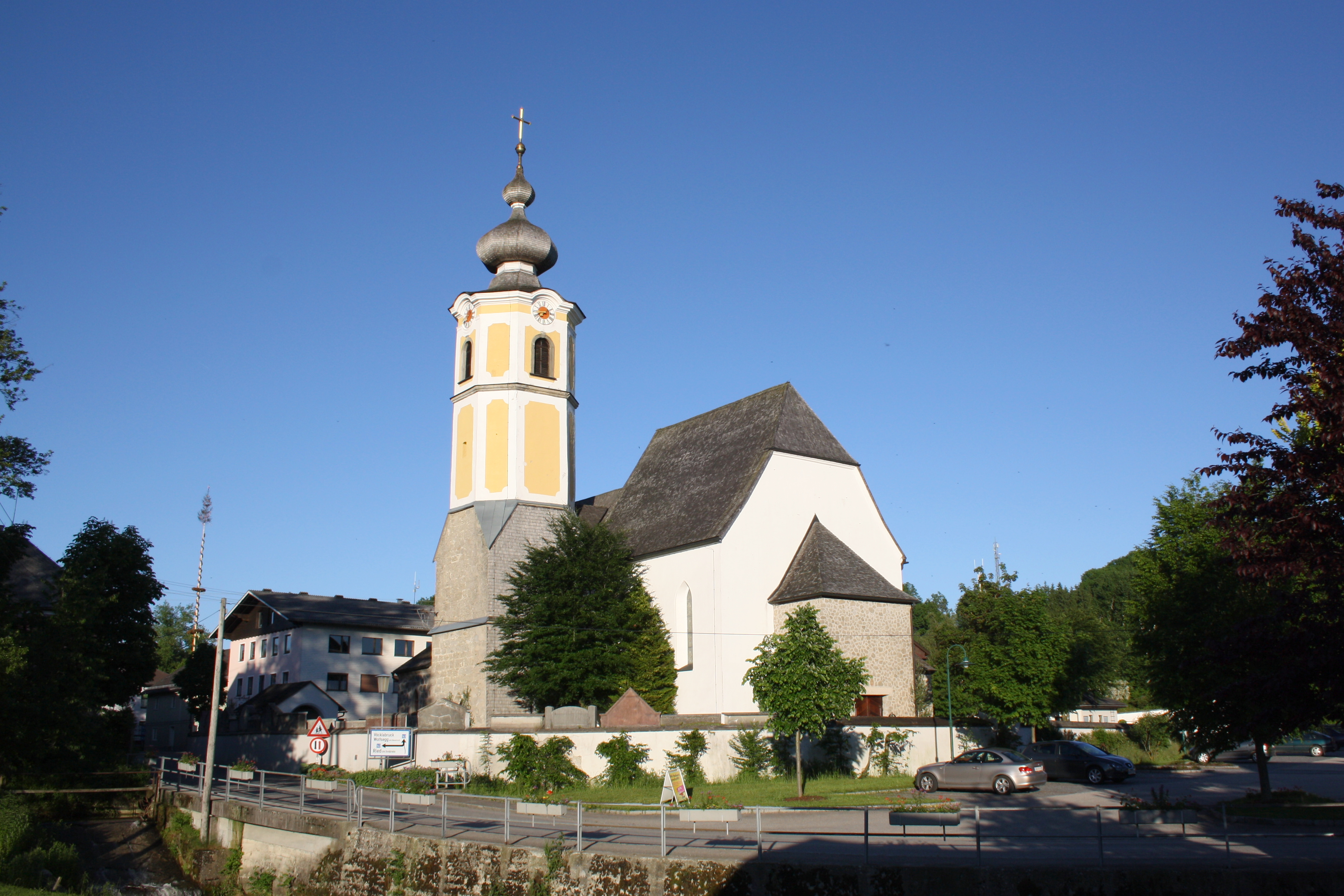

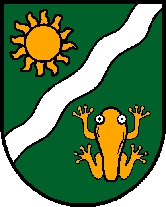
- Coat of arms

- Location within Austria
- Coordinates: 48°02′51″N 13°36′48″E
- Country: Austria
- State: Upper Austria
- District: Vöcklabruck

Government
  - Mayor: Johann Hippmair (ÖVP)

Area
  - Total: 14.43 km^{2} (5.57 sq mi)
- Elevation: 486 m (1,594 ft)

Population (2018-01-01)
  - Total: 1,492
  - Density: 103.4/km^{2} (267.8/sq mi)
- Time zone: UTC+1 (CET)
  - Summer (DST): UTC+2 (CEST)
- Postal code: 4841
- Area code: 07672
- Vehicle registration: VB
- Website: www.ungenach.at

Ungenach is a municipality in the district of Vöcklabruck in the Austrian state of Upper Austria.

== Population ==
Historical population
| Year | Pop. | ±% |
|---|---|---|
| 1991 | 1,237 | — |
| 2001 | 1,349 | +9.1% |
| 2016 | 1,498 | +11.0% |
