= Fornach =

- Municipality
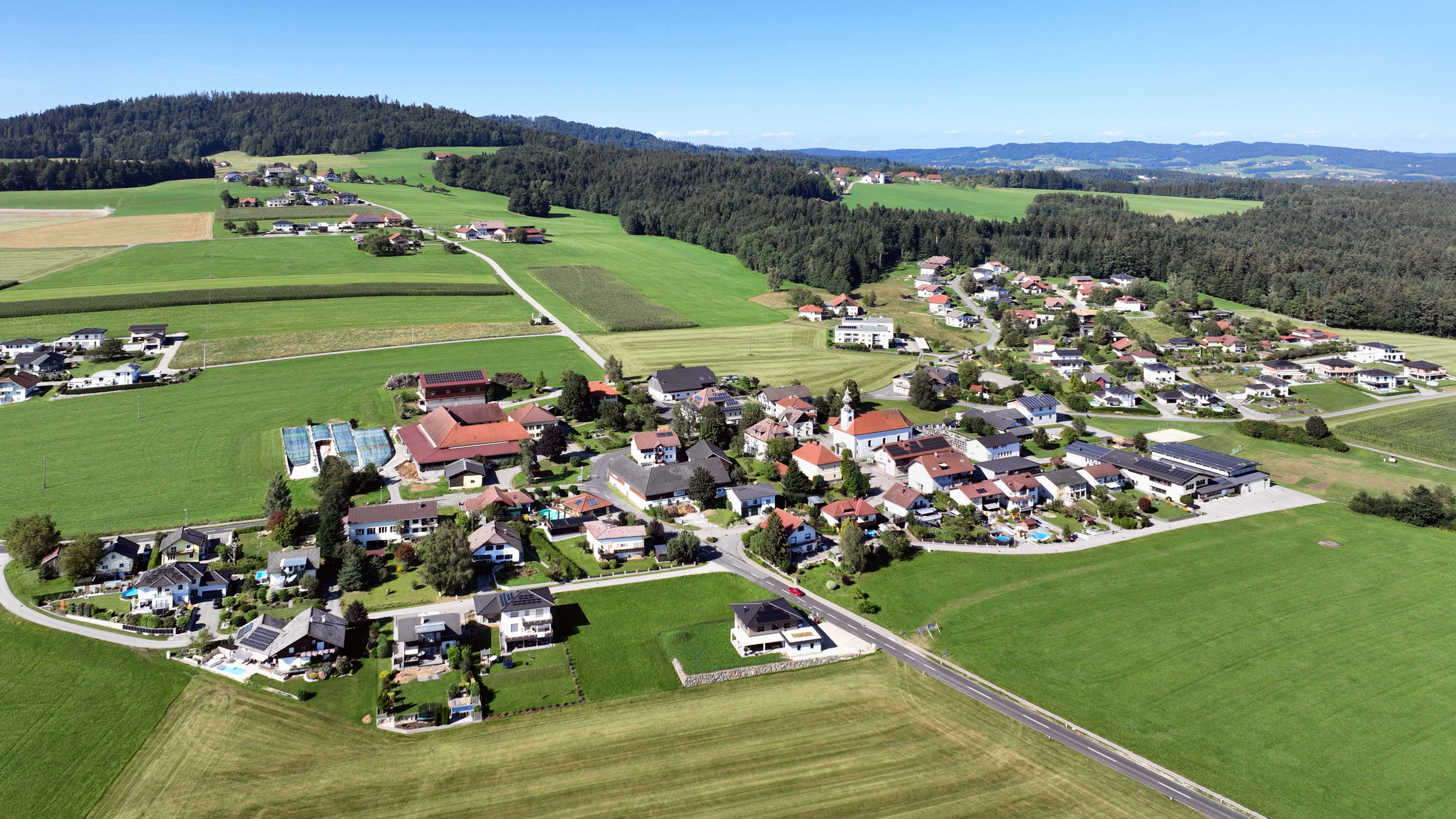
- South-southwest view of Fornach

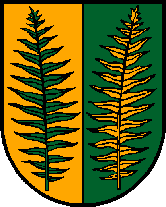
- Coat of arms

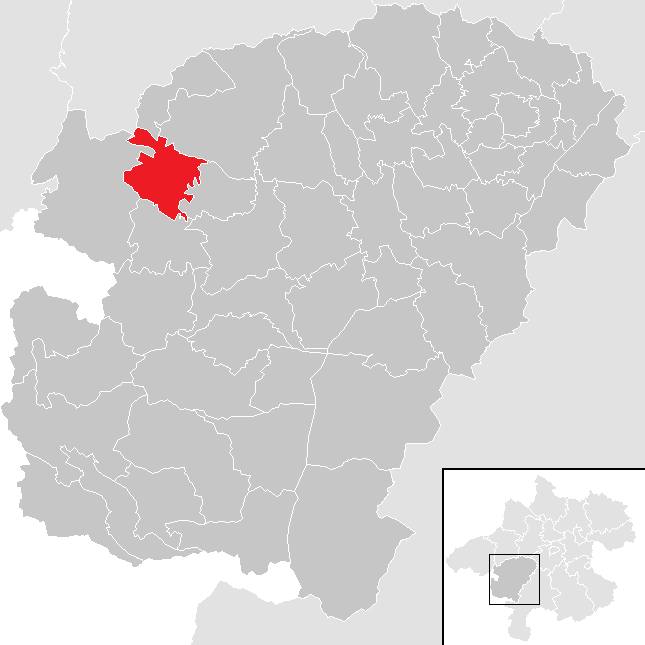
- Location in the district

- Location within Austria
- Coordinates: 48°01′25″N 13°25′53″E
- Country: Austria
- State: Upper Austria
- District: Vöcklabruck

Government
  - Mayor: Hubert Neuwirth (ÖVP)

Area
  - Total: 17.7 km^{2} (6.8 sq mi)
- Elevation: 565 m (1,854 ft)

Population (2018-01-01)
  - Total: 976
  - Density: 55.1/km^{2} (143/sq mi)
- Time zone: UTC+1 (CET)
  - Summer (DST): UTC+2 (CEST)
- Postal code: 4892
- Area code: 07682
- Vehicle registration: VB
- Website: www.fornach.ooe.gv.at

Fornach is a municipality in the district of Vöcklabruck in the Austrian state of Upper Austria.

== Population ==
Historical population
Year	Pop.	±%
1991	786	—
2001	863	+9.8%
2005	908	+5.2%
2016	952	+4.8%
