= Pfaffing, Austria =

Pfaffing
- Municipality
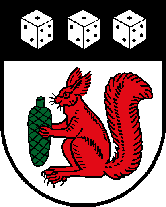
- Coat of arms

- Location within Austria
- Coordinates: 48°01′10″N 13°29′00″E
- Country: Austria
- State: Upper Austria
- District: Vöcklabruck

Government
  - Mayor: Gabriele Aigenstuhler (SPÖ)

Area
  - Total: 12.9 km^{2} (5.0 sq mi)
- Elevation: 555 m (1,821 ft)

Population (2018-01-01)
  - Total: 1,482
  - Density: 115/km^{2} (298/sq mi)
- Time zone: UTC+1 (CET)
  - Summer (DST): UTC+2 (CEST)
- Postal code: 4870
- Area code: 07682
- Vehicle registration: VB
- Website: www.pfaffing.at

Pfaffing (German pronunciation: [ˈpfafɪŋ]) is a municipality in the district of Vöcklabruck in the Austrian state of Upper Austria.

== Geography ==
=== Populated places ===
The municipality of Pfaffing consists of the following populated places (with population in brackets as of 1 January 2022).

- Außerreith (52)
- Fischham (55)
- Forsterreith (49)
- Frieding (44)
- Graben (99)
- Hainberg (6)
- Hainleiten (11)
- Hangstraße (78)
- Hausham (51)
- Holzpoint (110)
- Kienleiten (46)
- Kropfling (30)
- Maurachen (31)
- Mauracherberg (7)
- Mesnerleiten (46)
- Mitterberg (22)
- Nindorf (76)
- Oberalberting (114)
- Oberkogl (4)
- Obermoos (1)
- Pfaffing (108)
- Schneiderweg (20)
- Schweiber (45)
- Sieberer (32)
- Sonnleiten (138)
- Steinberg (18)
- Teicht (29)
- Teichweg (0)
- Tiefenbach (52)
- Unterkogl (22)
- Weixlbaum (13)
- Weixlbaumerberg (66)
- Ziegelhaid (66)

== Population ==
Historical population
Year	Pop.	±%
1991	1,266	—
2001	1,371	+8.3%
2016	1,504	+9.7%
