= Straß im Attergau =

- Municipality
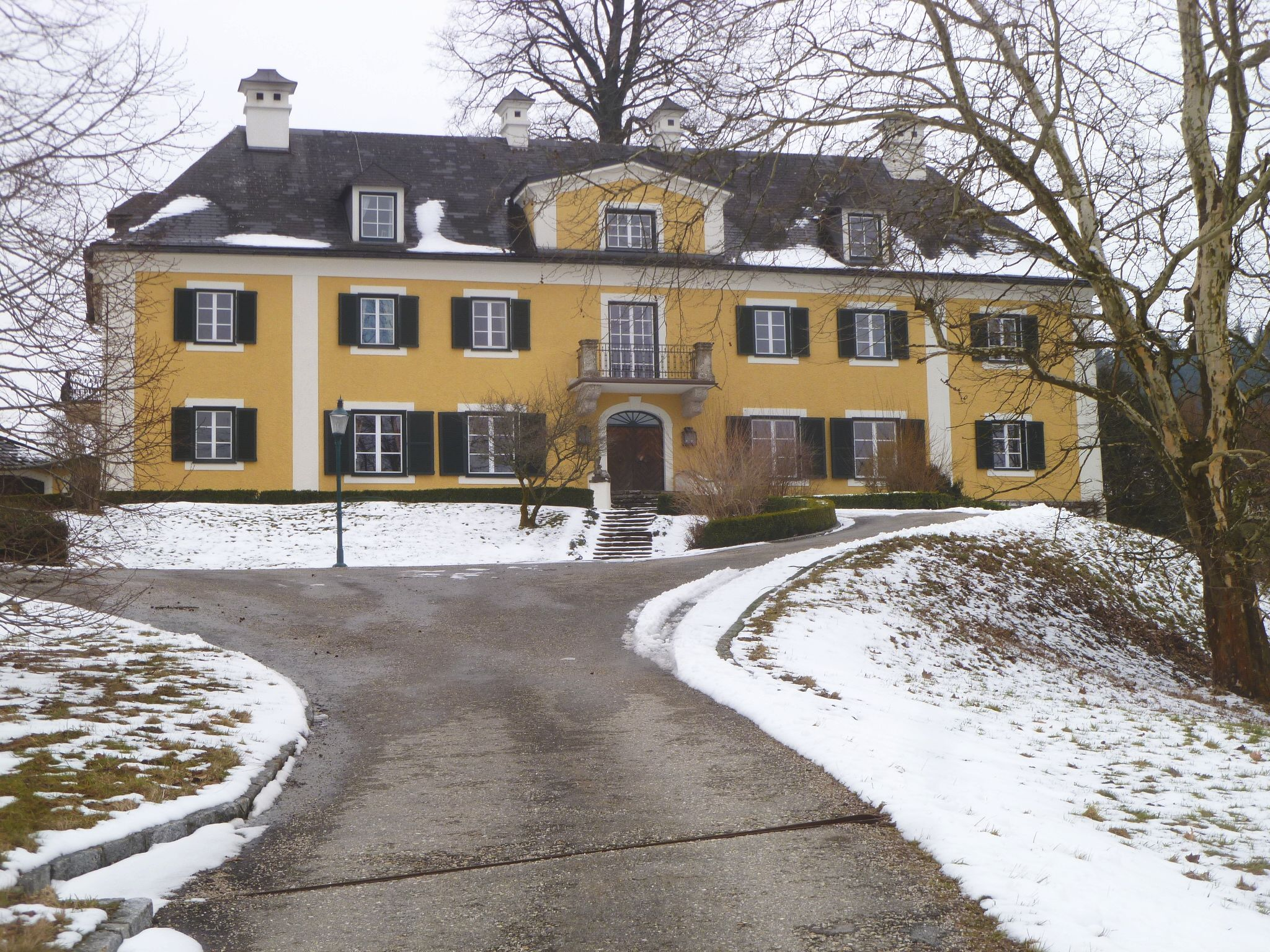
- Wildenhag palace

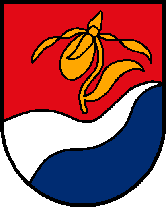
- Coat of arms

- Location within Austria
- Coordinates: 47°54′34″N 13°27′01″E
- Country: Austria
- State: Upper Austria
- District: Vöcklabruck

Government
  - Mayor: Markus Bradler (ÖVP)

Area
  - Total: 30.81 km^{2} (11.90 sq mi)
- Elevation: 570 m (1,870 ft)

Population (2018-01-01)
  - Total: 1,471
  - Density: 47.74/km^{2} (123.7/sq mi)
- Time zone: UTC+1 (CET)
  - Summer (DST): UTC+2 (CEST)
- Postal code: 4881
- Area code: 07667
- Vehicle registration: VB
- Website: www.oberoesterreich.at/ strass.attergau

Straß im Attergau is a municipality in the district of Vöcklabruck in the Austrian state of Upper Austria.

== Population ==
Historical population
Year	Pop.	±%
1991	1,556	—
2001	1,481	−4.8%
2016	1,475	−0.4%
