= Puchkirchen am Trattberg =

- Municipality
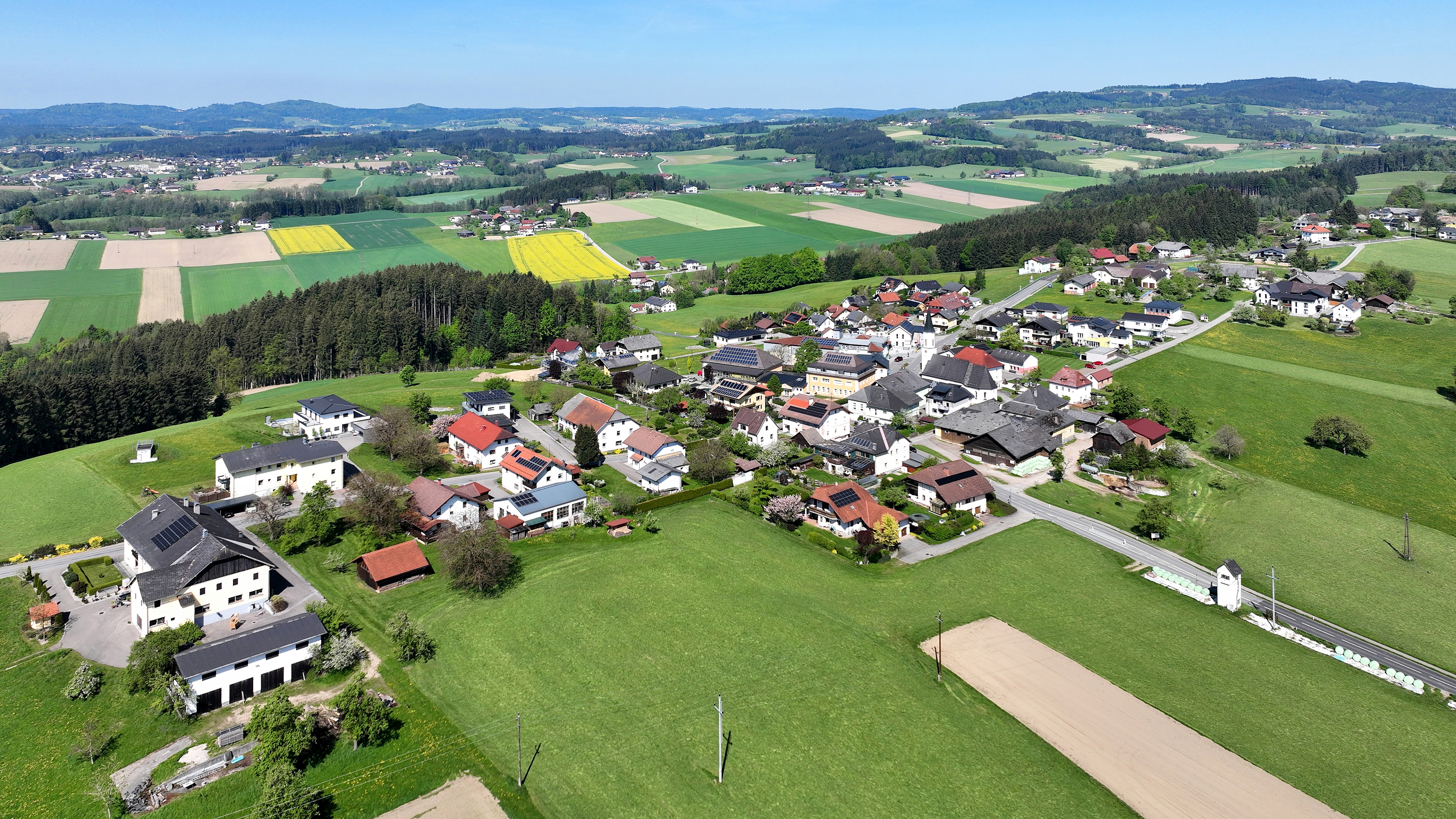
- Southeast view of Puchkirchen am Trattberg

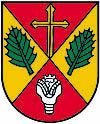
- Coat of arms

- Location within Austria
- Coordinates: 48°03′41″N 13°34′27″E
- Country: Austria
- State: Upper Austria
- District: Vöcklabruck

Government
  - Mayor: Anton Hüttmayr (ÖVP)

Area
  - Total: 7.73 km^{2} (2.98 sq mi)
- Elevation: 557 m (1,827 ft)

Population (2018-01-01)
  - Total: 1,036
  - Density: 134/km^{2} (347/sq mi)
- Time zone: UTC+1 (CET)
  - Summer (DST): UTC+2 (CEST)
- Postal code: 4850
- Area code: 07682
- Vehicle registration: VB
- Website: www.puchkirchen.at

Puchkirchen am Trattberg is a municipality in the district of Vöcklabruck in Upper Austria, Austria.
