= Innerschwand am Mondsee =

- Municipality
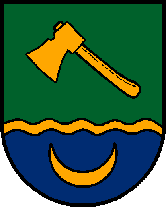
- Coat of arms

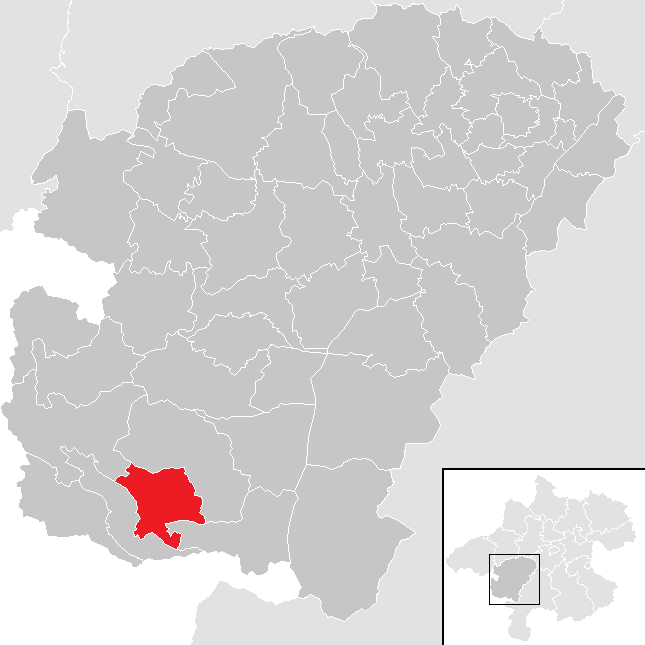
- Location in the district

- Location within Austria
- Coordinates: 47°49′54″N 13°24′02″E
- Country: Austria
- State: Upper Austria
- District: Vöcklabruck

Government
  - Mayor: Alois Daxinger (ÖVP)

Area
  - Total: 18.76 km^{2} (7.24 sq mi)
- Elevation: 493 m (1,617 ft)

Population (2018-01-01)
  - Total: 1,183
  - Density: 63.06/km^{2} (163.3/sq mi)
- Time zone: UTC+1 (CET)
  - Summer (DST): UTC+2 (CEST)
- Postal code: 5311
- Area code: 06232
- Vehicle registration: VB
- Website: www.innerschwand.at

Innerschwand am Mondsee is a municipality in the district of Vöcklabruck in the Austrian state of Upper Austria.

== Population ==
Historical population
Year	Pop.	±%
1991	903	—
2001	1,050	+16.3%
