= Frankenmarkt =

- Municipality
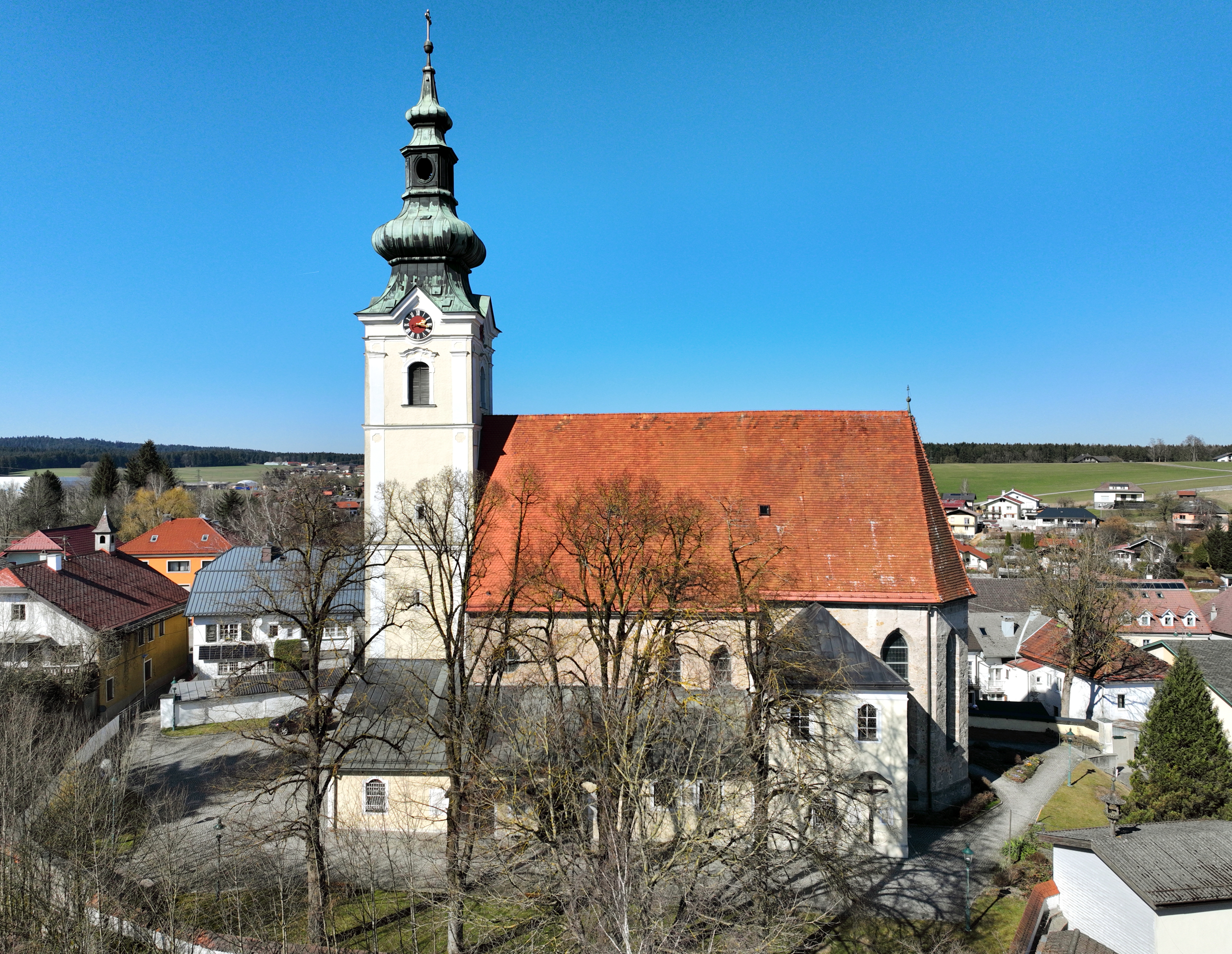

- Coat of arms

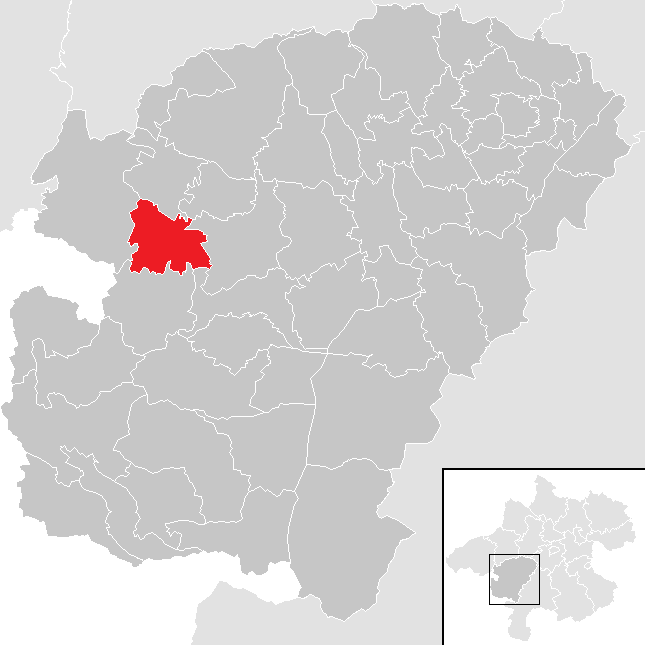
- Location in the district

- Location within Austria
- Coordinates: 47°59′01″N 13°25′24″E
- Country: Austria
- State: Upper Austria
- District: Vöcklabruck

Government
  - Mayor: Peter Zieher (ÖVP)

Area
  - Total: 18.47 km^{2} (7.13 sq mi)
- Elevation: 536 m (1,759 ft)

Population (2018-01-01)
  - Total: 3,636
  - Density: 196.9/km^{2} (509.9/sq mi)
- Time zone: UTC+1 (CET)
  - Summer (DST): UTC+2 (CEST)
- Postal code: 4890
- Area code: 07684
- Vehicle registration: VB
- Website: www.frankenmarkt.net

Frankenmarkt is a municipality in the district of Vöcklabruck in the Austrian state of Upper Austria.

== Population ==
Historical population
| Year | Pop. | ±% |
|---|---|---|
| 1991 | 3,233 | — |
| 2001 | 3,508 | +8.5% |
