= Oberwang =

- Municipality
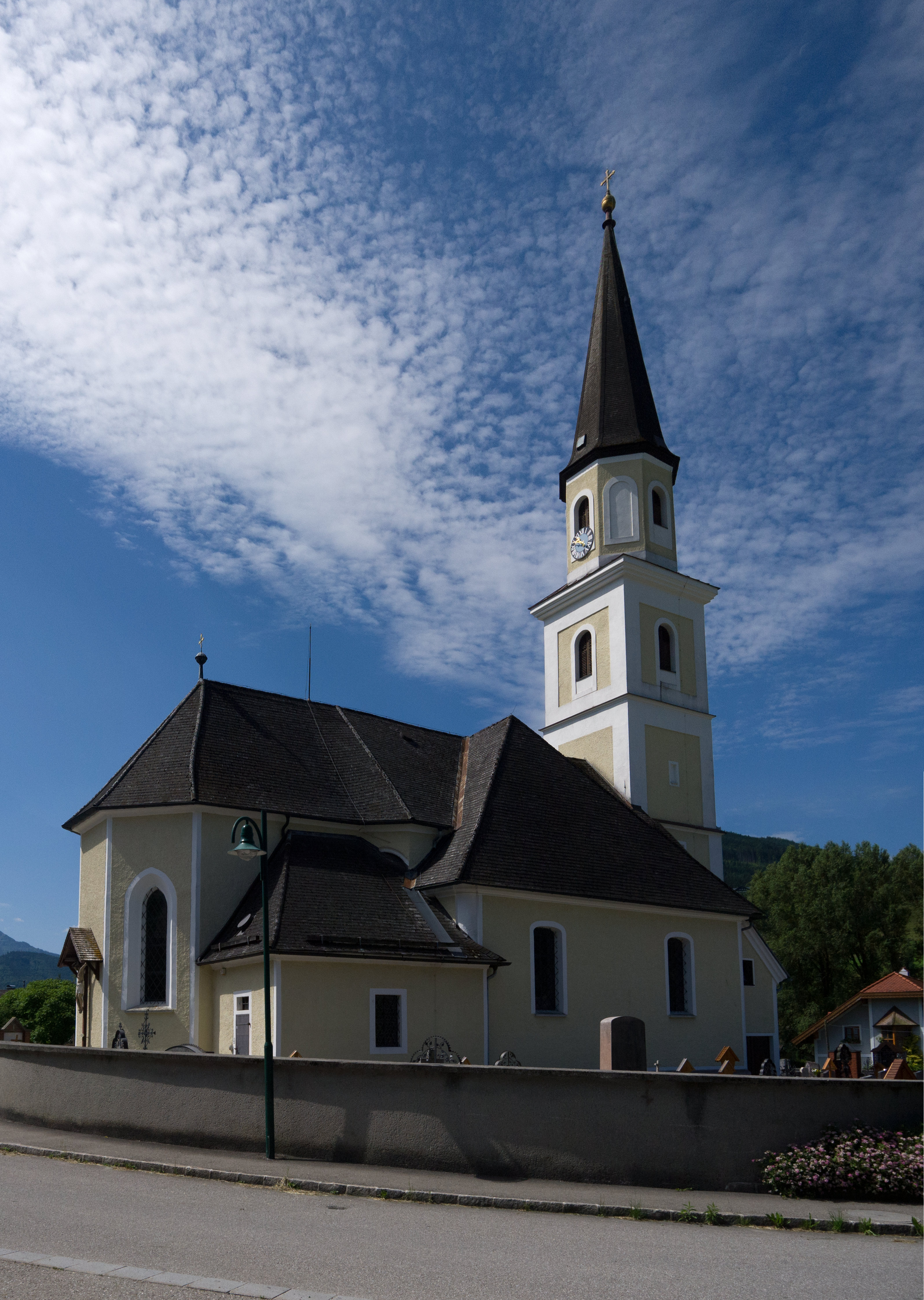

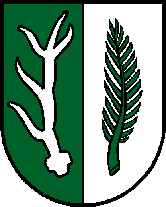
- Coat of arms

- Location within Austria
- Coordinates: 47°52′01″N 13°26′00″E
- Country: Austria
- State: Upper Austria
- District: Vöcklabruck

Government
  - Mayor: Matthias Hausleithner (ÖVP)

Area
  - Total: 38.78 km^{2} (14.97 sq mi)
- Elevation: 573 m (1,880 ft)

Population (2018-01-01)
  - Total: 1,708
  - Density: 44.04/km^{2} (114.1/sq mi)
- Time zone: UTC+1 (CET)
  - Summer (DST): UTC+2 (CEST)
- Postal code: 4882
- Area code: 06233
- Vehicle registration: VB

Oberwang is a municipality in the district of Vöcklabruck in the Austrian state of Upper Austria.

== Population ==
Historical population
| Year | Pop. | ±% |
|---|---|---|
| 1991 | 1,443 | — |
| 2001 | 1,572 | +8.9% |
| 2016 | 1,657 | +5.4% |
