= Aurach am Hongar =

- Municipality
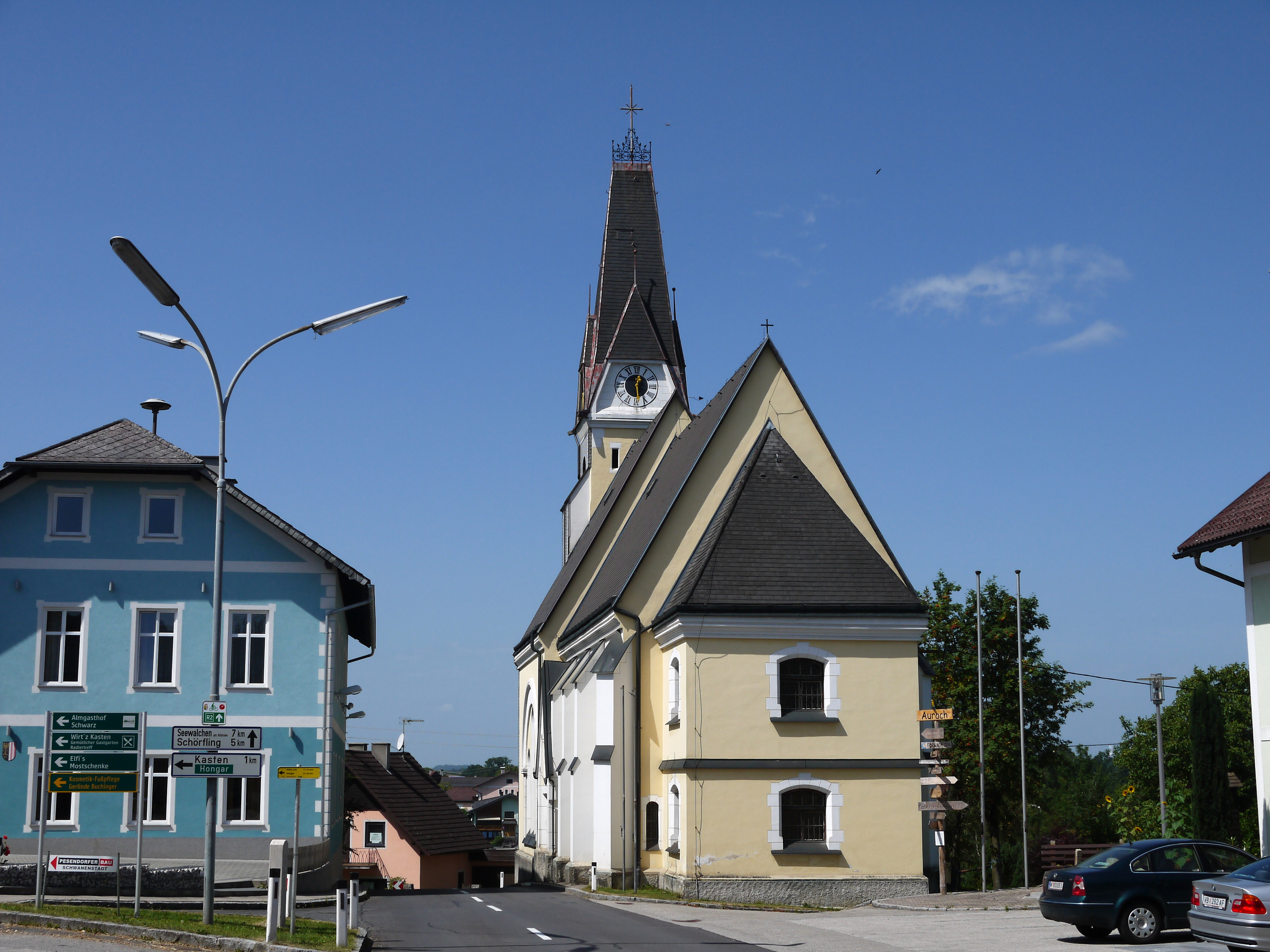

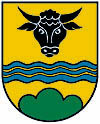
- Coat of arms

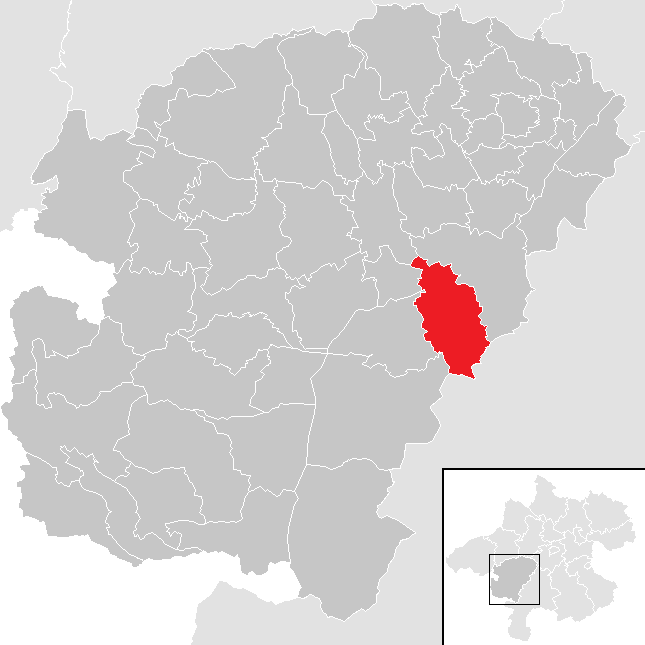
- Location in the district

- Location within Austria
- Coordinates: 47°57′01″N 13°40′02″E
- Country: Austria
- State: Upper Austria
- District: Vöcklabruck

Government
  - Mayor: Josef Staufer (ÖVP)

Area
  - Total: 24.77 km^{2} (9.56 sq mi)
- Elevation: 488 m (1,601 ft)

Population (2018-01-01)
  - Total: 1,715
  - Density: 69.24/km^{2} (179.3/sq mi)
- Time zone: UTC+1 (CET)
  - Summer (DST): UTC+2 (CEST)
- Postal code: 4861
- Area code: 07662
- Vehicle registration: VB
- Website: www.aurach.at

Aurach am Hongar is a municipality in the district of Vöcklabruck in the Austrian state of Upper Austria.

== Population ==
Historical population
Year	Pop.	±%
1991	1,368	—
2001	1,585	+15.9%
2016	1,672	+5.5%
