= Pilsbach =

- Municipality
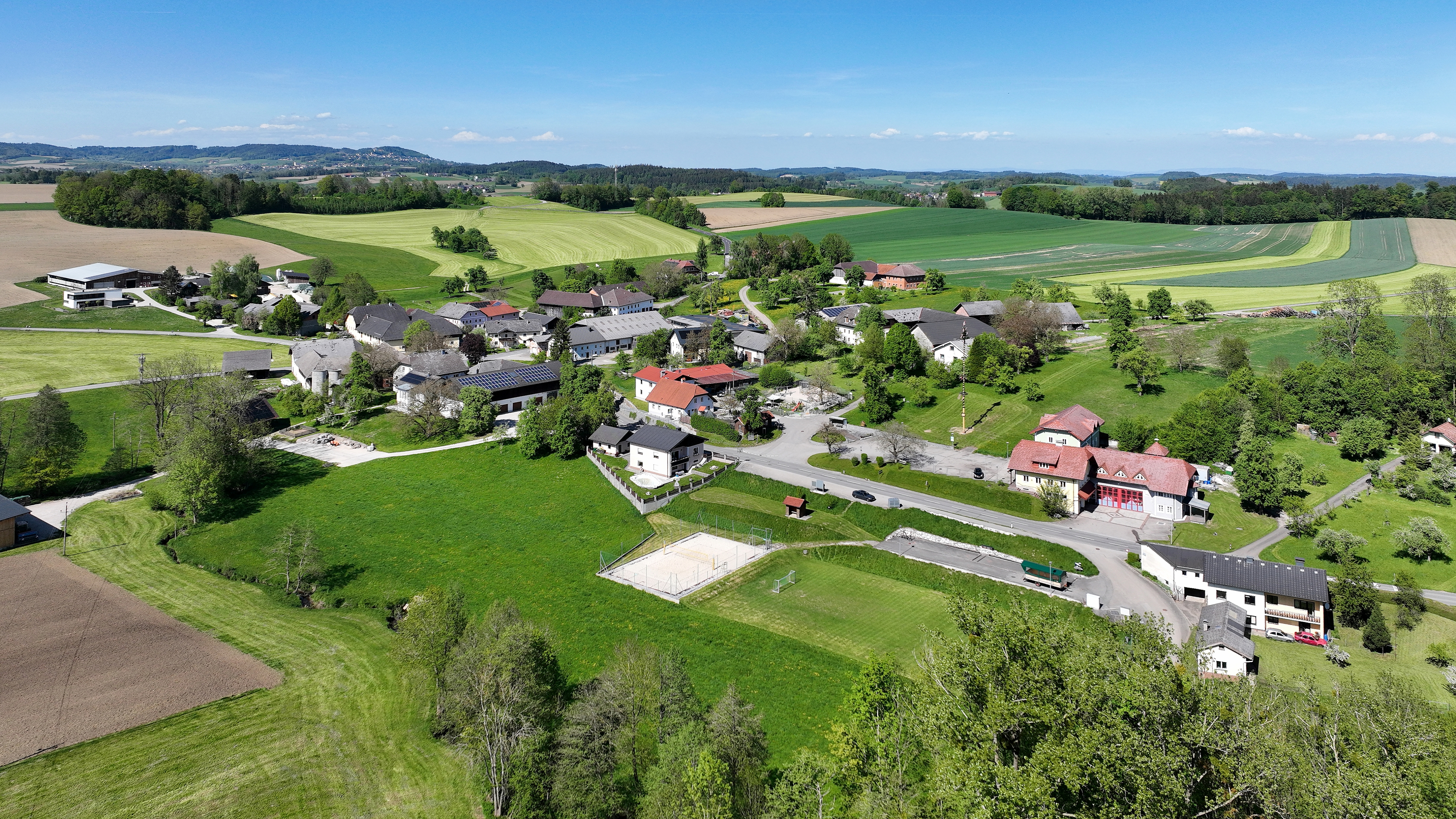
- South-southwest view of Pilsbach

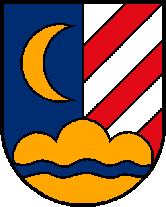
- Coat of arms

- Location within Austria
- Coordinates: 48°02′23″N 13°40′06″E
- Country: Austria
- State: Upper Austria
- District: Vöcklabruck

Government
  - Mayor: Alois Gruber (ÖVP)

Area
  - Total: 10.26 km^{2} (3.96 sq mi)
- Elevation: 475 m (1,558 ft)

Population (2018-01-01)
  - Total: 629
  - Density: 61.3/km^{2} (159/sq mi)
- Time zone: UTC+1 (CET)
  - Summer (DST): UTC+2 (CEST)
- Postal code: 4840, 4841, 4800
- Area code: 07672, 07676
- Vehicle registration: VB
- Website: www.pilsbach.at

Pilsbach is a town in the Austrian state of Upper Austria.

== Geography ==
Pilsbach lies in the area of Upper Austria known as the Hausruckviertel, about 4 km from Vöcklabruck. The total area of the town is 10.2 km², of which 45.1% is forested and 49% is used for agriculture. The town is divided into the neighborhoods of Einwald, Kien, Kirchstetten, Mittereinwald, Oberpilsbach, Schmidham, Untereinwald, and Unterpilsbach.

== History ==
Originally in the eastern portion of the Duchy of Bavaria, the town has belonged to Duchy of Austria since the 12th century. The town was occupied multiple times during the Napoleonic Wars. It became part of Upper Austria in 1918. After the Nazi annexation of Austria (Anschluss), the town became part of "Gau Oberdonau", returning to Upper Austria in 1945.

== Population ==
Historical population
Year	Pop.	±%
1991	554	—
2001	630	+13.7%
2016	608	−3.5%
