= Weyregg am Attersee =

- Municipality
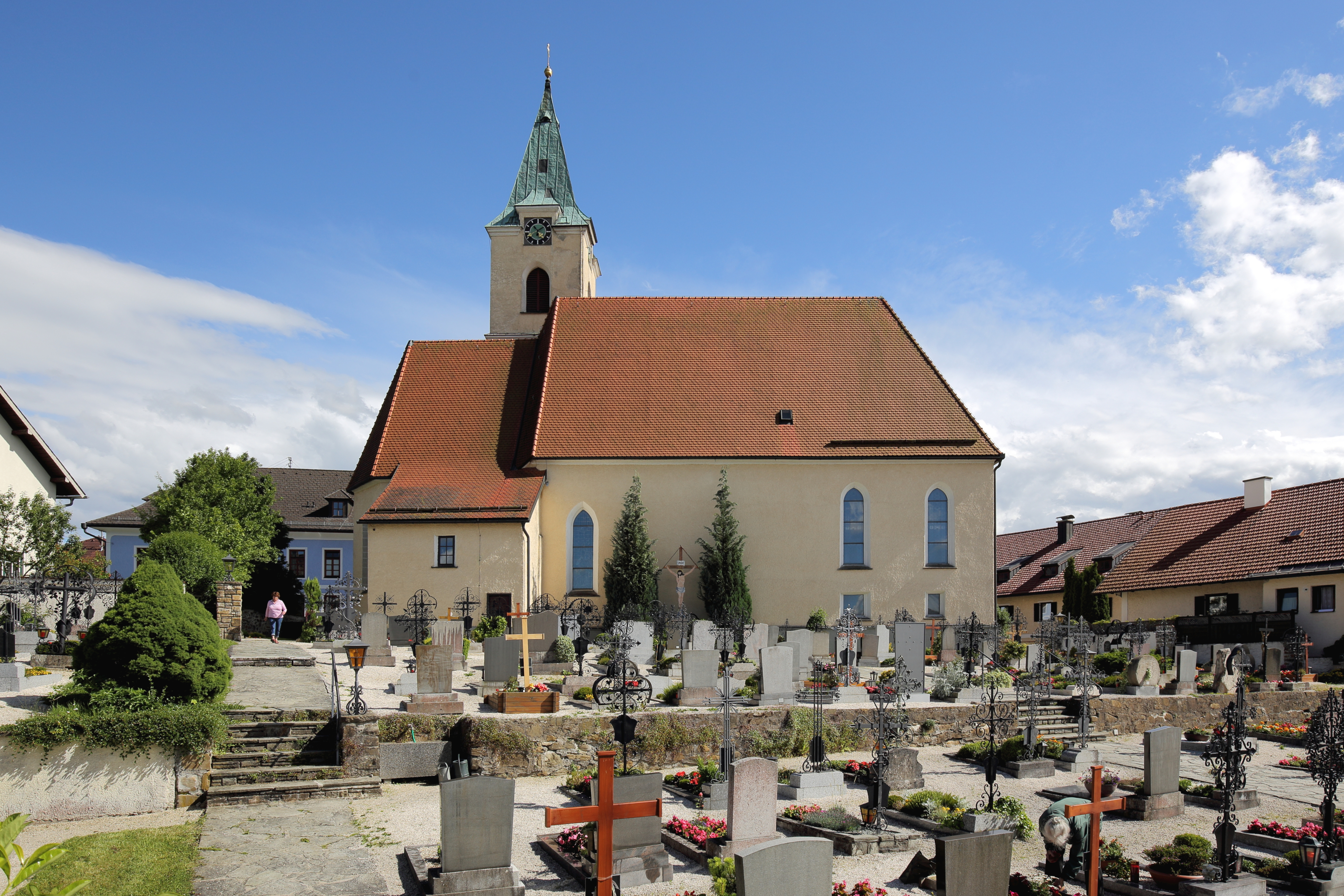

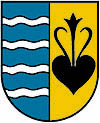
- Coat of arms

- Location within Austria
- Coordinates: 47°54′01″N 13°34′29″E
- Country: Austria
- State: Upper Austria
- District: Vöcklabruck

Government
  - Mayor: Hermann Staudinger (WBF)

Area
  - Total: 54.53 km^{2} (21.05 sq mi)
- Elevation: 482 m (1,581 ft)

Population (2018-01-01)
  - Total: 1,588
  - Density: 29.12/km^{2} (75.42/sq mi)
- Time zone: UTC+1 (CET)
  - Summer (DST): UTC+2 (CEST)
- Postal code: 4852
- Area code: 07664
- Vehicle registration: VB
- Website: www.weyregg.at

Weyregg am Attersee is a municipality in the district of Vöcklabruck in the Austrian state of Upper Austria.

== Population ==
Historical population
Year	Pop.	±%
1991	1,622	—
2001	1,503	−7.3%
