= Sankt Georgen im Attergau =

Sankt Georgen im Attergau Sont Tiareng im Attogau
- Municipality
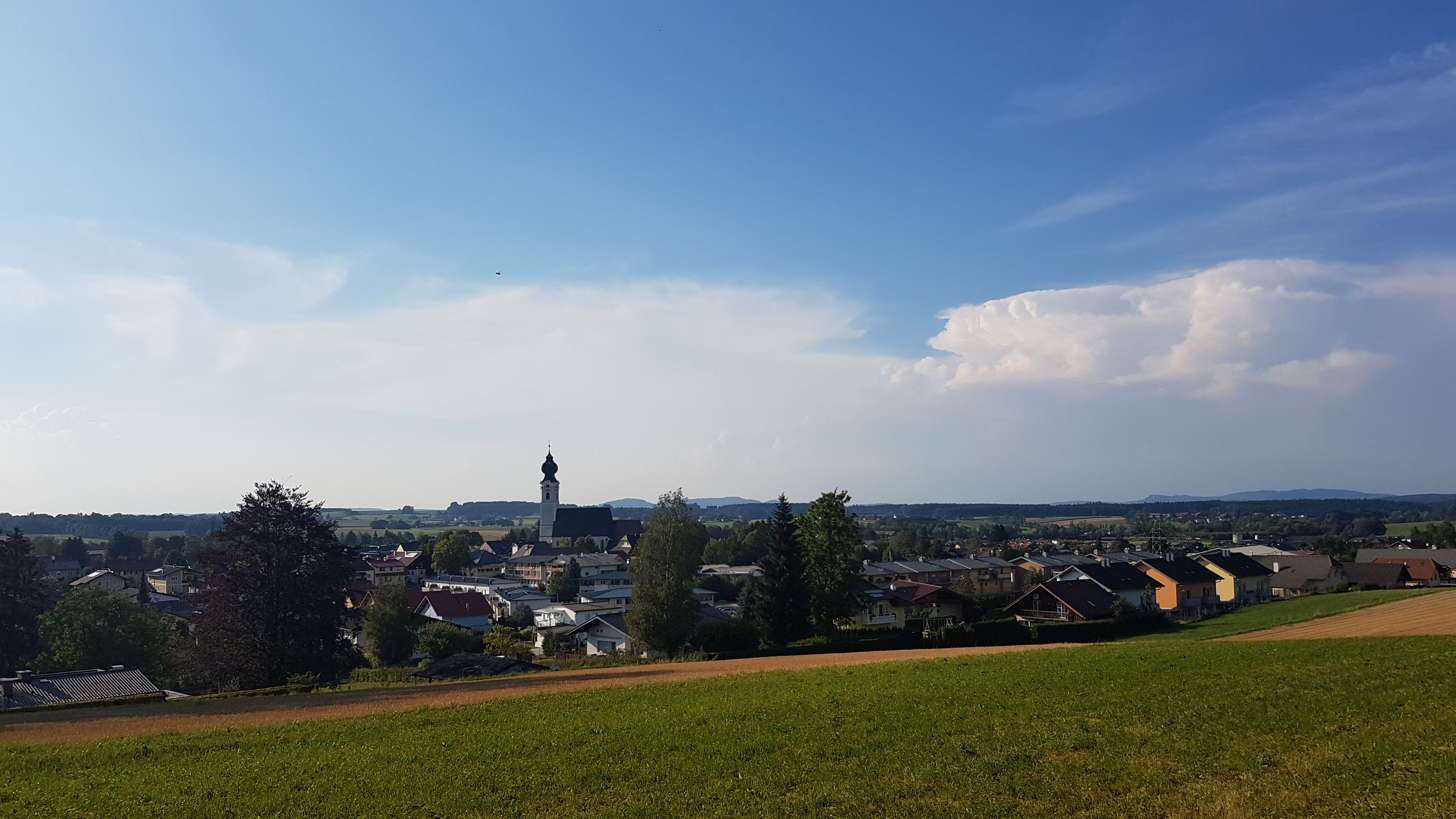

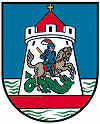
- Coat of arms

- Location within Austria
- Coordinates: 47°56′00″N 13°29′32″E
- Country: Austria
- State: Upper Austria
- District: Vöcklabruck

Government
  - Mayor: Ferdinand Aigner (ÖVP)

Area
  - Total: 15.49 km^{2} (5.98 sq mi)
- Elevation: 540 m (1,770 ft)

Population (2018-01-01)
  - Total: 4,375
  - Density: 282.4/km^{2} (731.5/sq mi)
- Time zone: UTC+1 (CET)
  - Summer (DST): UTC+2 (CEST)
- Postal code: 4880
- Area code: 07667
- Vehicle registration: VB
- Website: www.st-georgen-attergau.ooe.gv.at

Sankt Georgen im Attergau (Central Bavarian: Sont Tiareng im Attogau) is a municipality in the district of Vöcklabruck in the Austrian state of Upper Austria.

== Population ==
Historical population
Year	Pop.	±%
1991	3,652	—
2001	4,015	+9.9%
2016	4,385	+9.2%
