= Neukirchen an der Vöckla =

- Municipality
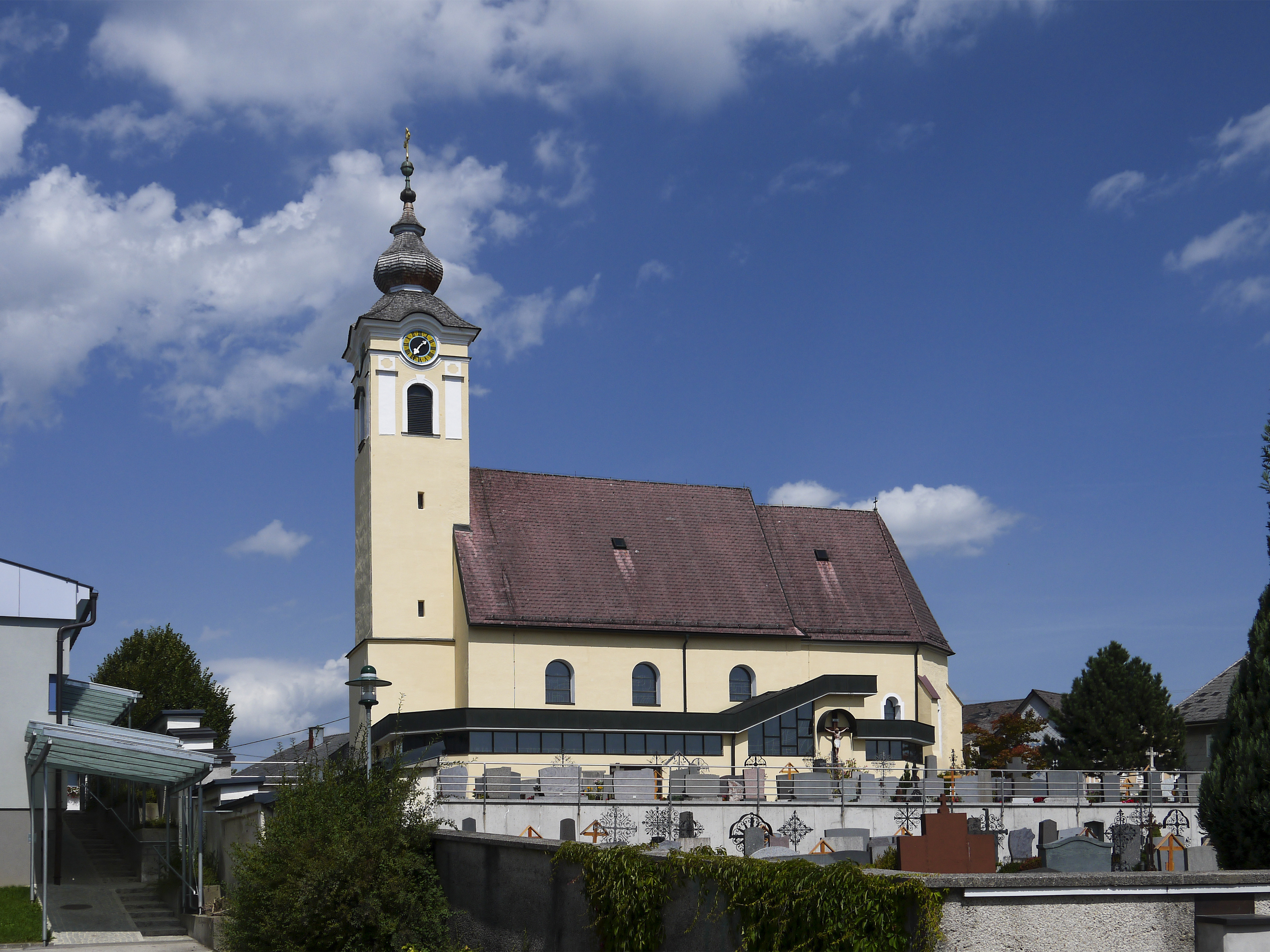

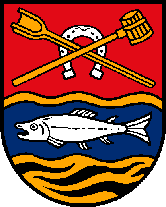
- Coat of arms

- Location within Austria
- Coordinates: 48°02′28″N 13°32′18″E
- Country: Austria
- State: Upper Austria
- District: Vöcklabruck

Government
  - Mayor: Franz Zeilinger (ÖVP)

Area
  - Total: 23.51 km^{2} (9.08 sq mi)
- Elevation: 516 m (1,693 ft)

Population (2018-01-01)
  - Total: 2,559
  - Density: 108.8/km^{2} (281.9/sq mi)
- Time zone: UTC+1 (CET)
  - Summer (DST): UTC+2 (CEST)
- Postal code: 4872
- Area code: 07682
- Vehicle registration: VB
- Website: www.neukirchen-voeckla.at

Neukirchen an der Vöckla is a municipality in the district of Vöcklabruck in the Austrian state of Upper Austria.

== Population ==
Historical population
Year	Pop.	±%
1991	2,455	—
2001	2,530	+3.1%
2016	2,548	+0.7%
