= Fertois =

Fertois is a Demonym referring to the inhabitants of any of several communes in France:

- La Ferté-Alais
- La Ferté-Bernard
- La Ferté-Chevresis
- La Ferté-Frênel
- La Ferté-Gaucher
- La Ferté-Loupière
- La Ferté-Macé
- La Ferté-sous-Jouarre

== See also ==
- La Ferté (disambiguation), similarly named communes in France
