= Hinterhubera =

Scientific classification
- Kingdom: Plantae
- Clade: Tracheophytes
- Clade: Angiosperms
- Clade: Eudicots
- Clade: Asterids
- Order: Asterales
- Family: Asteraceae
- Subfamily: Asteroideae
- Tribe: Astereae
- Subtribe: Baccharidinae
- Genus: Hinterhubera; Sch.Bip. ex Wedd.

Genus of flowering plants

Hinterhubera is a genus of flowering plants in the family Asteraceae.

They are native to northern Colombia and north-western Venezuela.

The genus name of Hinterhubera is in honour of Rudolph Hinterhuber (1802–1892), an Austrian botanist and apothecary in Bolzano and Mondsee. It was first described and published in Chlor. Andina Vol.1 on page 185 in 1857.

== Known species ==
According to Kew;

- Hinterhubera adenopetala Cuatrec. & Aristeg.
- Hinterhubera columbica Sch.Bip. ex Wedd.
- Hinterhubera ericoides Wedd.
- Hinterhubera harrietae Cuatrec.
- Hinterhubera imbricata Cuatrec. & Aristeg.
- Hinterhubera lanuginosa Cuatrec. & Aristeg.
- Hinterhubera laseguei Wedd.
- Hinterhubera longiloba M.Carrillo, Lapp & Torrec.
- Hinterhubera nevadensis Cuatrec.
