= Ferté =

Ferté (French pronunciation: [fɛʁte]) is a surname of French origin, meaning fortress or bastion. Notable people with the surname include:

- Alain Ferté (born 1955), French racing driver
- Denis-Pierre-Jean Papillon de la Ferté (1727—1794), French civil servant
- Henri de La Ferté-Senneterre (1599–1681), French military governor and Marshal of France
- Hue de la Ferté (fl. 1220–1235), French trouvère
- Jean Charles de la Ferté (1685–1771), French aristocrat, diplomat, and Marshal of France
- Jeanne-Françoise Juchereau de la Ferté de Saint-Ignace (1650–1723), Québécois nun
- Michel Ferté (1958–2023), French racing driver
- Philip Joubert de la Ferté (1887–1965), British Royal Air Force commander
- René Ferté (1903–1958), Swiss actor
- Stephen of La Ferté (fl. c. 1128–1130), French priest and Latin patriarch of Jerusalem

== See also ==
- La Ferté, list of place names
