= Gauville =

Gauville is the name or part of the name of the following communes in France:

- Gauville, Orne, in the Orne department
- Gauville, Somme, in the Somme department
- Gauville-la-Campagne, in the Eure department
