= Hanne Nielsen =

Danish farmer

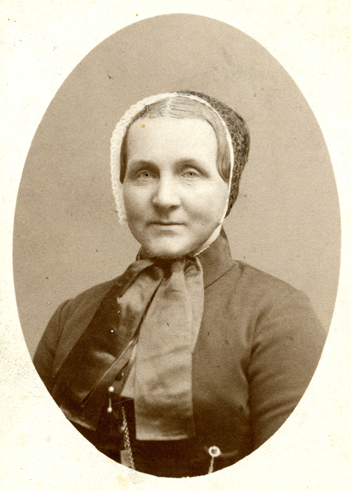
- Born: 11 September 1829
- Died: 15 June 1903 (aged 73)
- Occupations: Butter and cheese maker

Johanne (Hanne) Ane Margrethe Nielsen (née Jacobsdatter, 11 September 1829 – 15 June 1903) was a Danish farmer who may have invented Havarti cheese. In the 1800s, Nielsen traveled around Europe to learn about cheesemaking. Her farm was named Havarthigaard and was close to Copenhagen. After returning from her travels, she developed the technique to create a new type of cheese. She was also a teacher, writer, and an accountant for the profit made from her butter and cheese. Her butter and cheese were served to royal families, including a cheese made with cumin that was served to King Christian IX of Denmark. She was denied membership of the Royal Danish Agricultural Society although she had sought the assistance of dairy scientist Thomas Segelcke. Despite being skeptical of female accountants, Segelcke included her accounting method in a book he published.

== Early life ==
Nielsen was born on a farm in Søllerød near Copenhagen on 11 September 1829, close to the farm where she lived in 1902. She married Hans Nielsen when she was 19 years old and they lived in a home named Havarthigaard. Nielsen and her husband sold milk from their cows, but she was unhappy with the profit from the milk so she sold it as butter and cheese. Although Nielsen's attempts at selling butter and milk were successful from the beginning, she was not happy with the final products and decided to educate herself on better methods. Other farmers' wives were able to produce similar butter and cheese, but Nielsen wanted hers to be better than theirs. She studied subjects relating to dairy produce and traveled to Norway, Sweden, Switzerland and France, among others, to learn how to obtain better results. Nielsen learned how to make cheddar cheese with Joseph Harding in England, brie and Roquefort in France, and Gouda cheese along with Edam cheese in the Netherlands.

== Career ==
Nielsen opened a dairy school on her farm where she taught a total of around 1,000 students from 1866 to 1903, many of them from Sweden. In September 1902, it was reported that all of the then-current dairy instructors in Denmark had received at least part of their training from her.

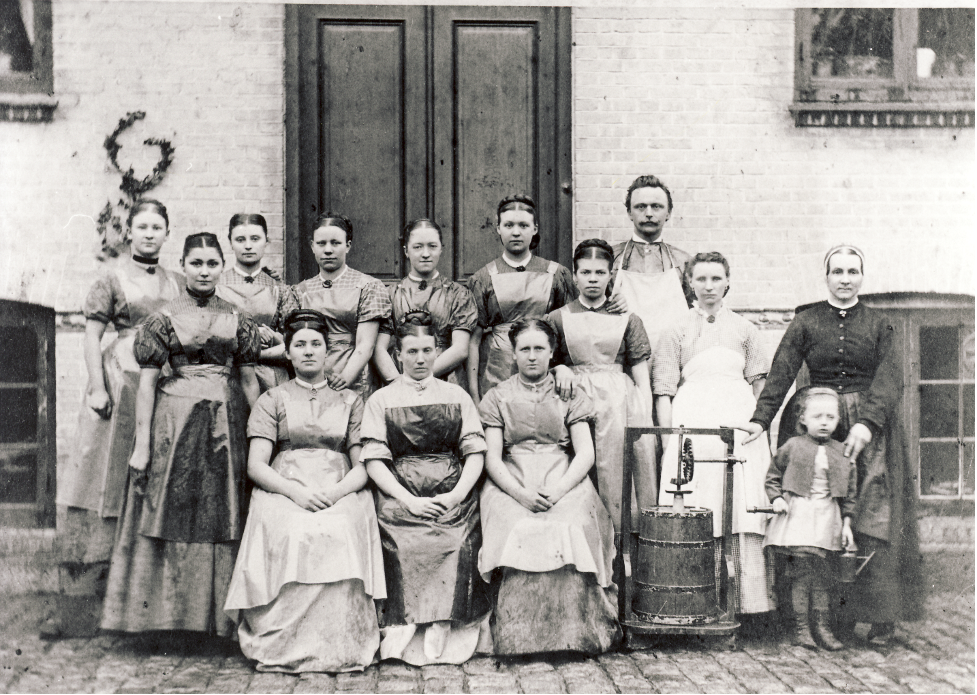
Havarti students at Havarthigaard farm in 1875 (Hanne Nielsen is at right behind her granddaughter)

She wrote press articles, held lectures, and published an 1886 Swedish manual on making butter. Nielsen won multiple prizes from the Royal Danish Agricultural Society, but the society did not allow her to become a member as they did not think it would be acceptable to have a woman at their meetings. She asked dairy scientist Thomas Riise Segelcke to let her become a member of the Agricultural Society, but he did not help her although he was a friend and visited her farm frequently. Segelcke wrote a letter to Nielsen that said, "Mrs. Hanne Nielsen, Prof. Jorgensen continues to oppose women's participation in the Agricultural Society, so there is no point in your pursuing this matter. Please be so kind as not to intrude. Yours truly, Th. Segelcke". Despite her name appearing on a membership list of the Agricultural Society from 1870 to 1871, there is no documentation of Nielsen participating in a meeting.

Nielsen was responsible for the keeping the farm accounts, which was common in Denmark. Segelcke was skeptical of accounting completed by women, but he based a book on Nielsen's accounting system that included a section about cheese.

Nielsen made goat milk into cheese along with milk from 14 cows. The 1881 book The Channel Islands: Their People and Their Cattle said that "the products have become famous, and are found on the table of the king". Her butter and milk was served to royal families in Denmark. She created a Tilsit cheese with cumin for King Christian IX of Denmark. She was known by people in Scandinavian countries and by people that had an interest in dairy work within Europe. Due to her success, Nielsen was paid more than most other farm workers.

=== Legacy ===
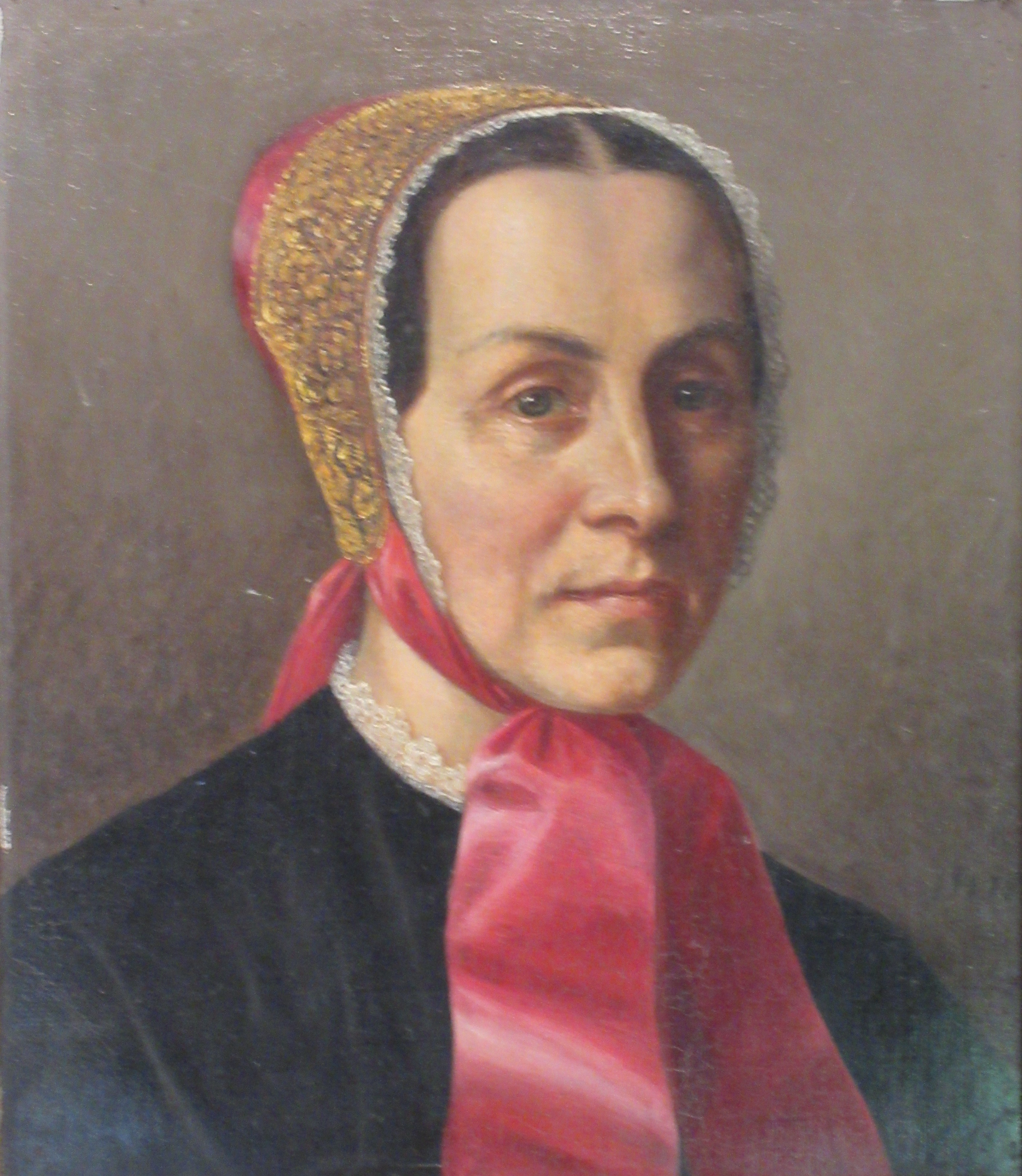
Portrait of Hanne Nielsen by unknown artist from the collection of Rudersdal Museum, Mothsgården.

The Rudersdal museums in Denmark have a permanent exhibition concerning Nielsen and her cheesemaking development. The exhibits include her hand-cranked butter churn which she used until steam-powered centrifuges were available.

=== Havarti cheese ===
Havarti was previously called "Danish Tilsiter" after the German cheese type tilsiter. Danish production began in 1921. In 1952, the cheese was named Havarti, after Havartigården near Holte, where the Danish cheese pioneer Hanne Nielsen worked in the 1800s. Among other cheeses, Nielsen created a Tilsit cheese with cumin for King Christian IX of Denmark.

Some sources such as The Oxford Companion to Cheese say that Nielsen invented Havarti cheese, while the Dansk Biografisk Leksikon states that the current Havarti is not based on her cheesemaking.

Havarti cheese has a mild taste and is somewhat acidic. The cheese is now made in the United Kingdom, Canada, and the United States. Denmark exports Havarti cheese to various countries. It is semi-hard with small holes.
