= Couvains =

Couvains is the name of several communes in France:

- Couvains, Manche
- Couvains, Orne
