= Pont-l'Évêque cheese =

French cheese from Normandy

Pont-l'Évêque
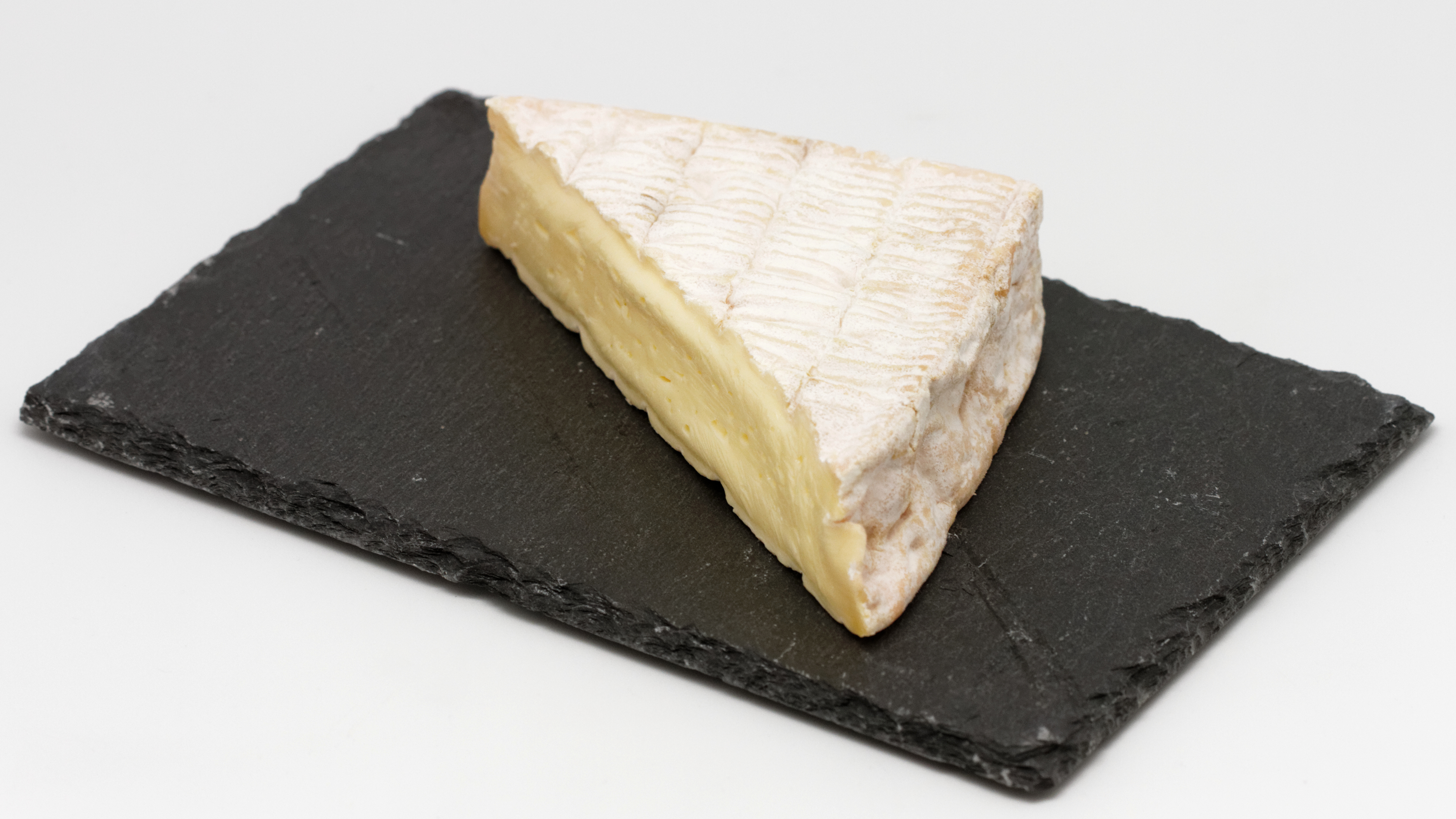
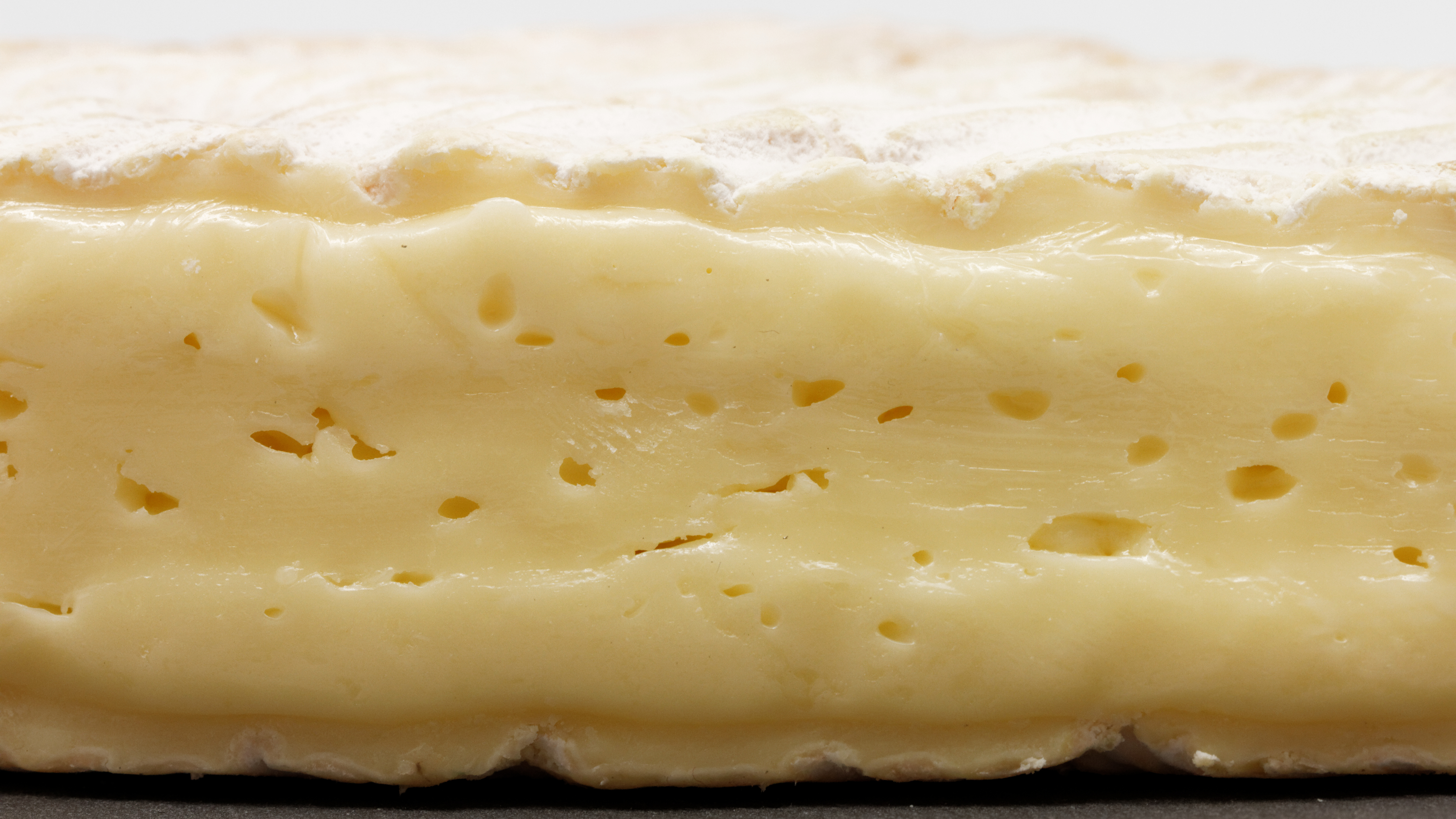
- Pont-l'Évêque Texture of Pont-l'Évêque
- Country of origin: France
- Region: Normandy
- Town: Pont-l'Évêque
- Source of milk: Cow
- Pasteurized: Frequently
- Texture: Soft, washed rind
- Fat content: Depends on variety
- Aging time: 4-6 weeks
- Certification: AOC 1976

Pont-l'Évêque (/ˌpɒ̃ ləˈvɛk, ˌpɒnt -/, French: [pɔ̃ levɛːk]) is a French cheese, originally manufactured in the area around the commune of Pont-l'Évêque, between Deauville and Lisieux in the Calvados département of Normandy. It is probably the oldest Norman cheese still in production.

Pont-l'Évêque is an uncooked, unpressed cow's-milk cheese, square in shape usually at around 10 cm (4 in) square and around 3 cm (1 1/4 in) high, weighing 400 grams (14 oz). The central pâte is soft, creamy pale yellow in color with a smooth, fine texture and has a pungent aroma. This is surrounded by a washed rind that is white with a gentle orange-brown coloration. The whole is soft when pressed but lacks elasticity. It is generally ranked alongside Brie, Camembert, and Roquefort as one of the most popular cheeses in France.

== History ==
The cheese has been made in Normandy since at least the 12th century, and was allegedly first made by Cistercian monks who had settled west of Caen. Originally known as "cherub", it later took the name "angelot". Becoming popular across the country from the 16th century onwards, it then acquired the name of the village around which its production was centred.

== Manufacture ==
Pont-l'Évêque was recognised as an Appellation d'Origine Contrôlée (AOC) cheese on August 30, 1972, reaching full status in 1976. Its production was defined and protected with a decree of December 29, 1986. Le Petit Futé guides commend that the best AOC Pont-l'évêque comes from the Pays d'Auge, which includes the Canton of Pont-l'Evêque itself.

The AOC regulations include the following restrictions:

- The milk must come from a controlled area around the village of Pont-l'Évêque, extending to the départments of Calvados, Eure, Manche, Mayenne, Orne and Seine-Maritime.
- The curd must be successively divided, kneaded and then drained.
- During affinage the cheeses must be washed, brushed and turned.
- The resulting cheese must be one of three sizes:
  - Petit – 8.5–9.5 cm square, and a minimum of 85g of dry matter.
  - Demi – 10.5–11.5 cm by 5.2–5.7 cm, with a minimum of 70g of dry matter.
  - Grand – 19–21 cm square, with a minimum of 650g of dry matter.

The affinage lasts at least two weeks after production, though most are left for over six weeks.

The cheese is around 45% fat as a percentage of dry matter and is manufactured throughout the year. Regulations currently allow either pasteurized or unpasteurized milk to be used for its manufacture.

The annual production is around 3,500 tonnes, of which the majority is made by two large producers. Only 2% of the production is classed as fermier. Acclaimed manufacturers include Bisson et fils, Lanquetôt, Lepeudry, and Levasseur.

Recipes include use in three-cheese fondue together with livarot and camembert, to accompany tournedos de veau.

== See also ==
- List of cheeses
