= Havarti =

Danish creamy semi-soft cow's milk cheese

- Other names: cream havarti, flødehavarti
- Country of origin: Denmark
- Region: Hovedstaden
- Town: Øverød
- Source of milk: Cow
- Texture: Semi-soft
- Fat content: 38
- Aging time: 3 months
- Certification: Havarti PGI (Oct. 2019)

Havarti (Danish pronunciation: [hæˈvɑːtsʰi]) or cream Havarti (Danish: flødehavarti) is a semisoft Danish cow's milk cheese. It can be sliced, grilled, or melted.

== History ==
Havarti was previously called "Danish Tilsiter" after the German cheese type tilsiter. Danish production began in 1921. In 1952, the cheese was named Havarti, after Havartigården near Holte, where the Danish cheese pioneer Hanne Nielsen worked in the 19th century. Among other cheeses, Nielsen created a Tilsit cheese with caraway for King Christian IX of Denmark.

Some sources, such as The Oxford Companion to Cheese, say that Nielsen invented Havarti cheese, while the Dansk Biografisk Leksikon states that the current Havarti is not based on her cheesemaking.

The original Havarti cheese is different from flødehavarti ("cream Havarti"), which is made from flash pasteurized milk, so that the whey proteins that would otherwise be eliminated during production remain in the curd. This raises yields, but alters the taste and texture. Cream Havarti usually ripens very little, since the remaining whey proteins cause problems (off-taste, odd appearance) during prolonged ripening.

== Description ==
Havarti is made, like most cheeses, by introducing rennet to milk to cause curdling. The curds are pressed into cheese molds which are drained, and then the cheese is aged.

Havarti was traditionally a smear-ripened cheese, but modern flødehavarti is not. Havarti is a washed-curd cheese, which contributes to the subtle flavor of the cheese. Havarti is an interior-ripened cheese that is rindless, smooth, and slightly bright-surfaced with a cream to yellow color depending on type. It has very small and irregular openings called eyes distributed throughout.

Havarti has a buttery aroma and can be somewhat sharp in the stronger varieties, much like Swiss-type cheeses. The taste is buttery, from somewhat to very sweet, and slightly acidic, similar in taste to mozzarella. It is typically aged about three months, though when the cheese is older, it becomes more salty and tastes like hazelnut. When left at room temperature, the cheese tends to soften quickly.

Flavored variants of Havarti are available.

== Production ==
In 2013, 18,900 metric tons were produced in Denmark. As of 2019, 17,000 metric tons are produced annually in Denmark, of which 3,000 to 4,000 metric tons are consumed domestically. In 2015, 17,700 metric tons were produced in Wisconsin and 7,400 in Canada. In 2018, Wisconsin produced 18,400 metric tons and Canada 7,500 metric tons.

Less than half of the world production is made in Denmark. Other major producers in the EU are Germany and Spain. Internationally, the main producers are the United States and Canada, with other producing countries including Finland, Poland, France, Australia and New Zealand. In the United States, the main producing state by far is Wisconsin, with other producing states being California, Illinois, Iowa, Michigan, Minnesota, New York, Ohio, Oregon, Pennsylvania, Vermont and Washington. The Danish multinational Arla Foods produces the cheese for the American market in Wisconsin from milk produced in Wisconsin.

Havarti is one of twelve cheeses whose characteristics and manufacturing standards are registered in the Codex Alimentarius as of 2019.

== Consumption ==
It has become a staple foodstuff in Denmark.

== Nutrition ==
For one slice weighing 28 g:

- Food energy: 500 kilojoules (120 kilocalories)
- Protein: 6.0 g
- Carbohydrate: 0.0 g
- Total fat: 11.0 g
- Fiber: 0.0 g
- Calcium: 150 mg

== Controversy ==
In October 2019, the EU granted exclusive Protected Geographical Indication (PGI) rights to Denmark after four years of lobbying by the Danish industry. It may now only be produced from Danish milk and at approved dairies for it to be sold in the EU and countries with which it has signed a trade agreement recognising EU PGI rules on cheese (specifically South Korea). There was vehement opposition and pressure from the United States against recognition; the EU was earlier compelled to postpone the planned PGI status for fear that it might be deemed too provocative amidst indications of political backlash from the US.

The Consortium for Common Food Names (CCFN), an industry alliance based in Virginia, United States, representing exporting interests founded by the US Dairy Export Council to fight EU geographical indication guidelines expressed outrage over the 2019 EU decision to reserve the name for Denmark, claiming the PGI status is not "legitimate intellectual property protection, but instead for barely concealed protectionism for economic gain". The United States, Australia, New Zealand, Uruguay and Argentina have joined with the CCFN to overturn the decision. The CCFN has claimed that Havarti is a generic cheese, and that the EU is trying to "egregiously ... monopolise global trade" in this and many other traditional European products, and is disregarding "established international standards". The CCFN demands that EU PGIs be amended to include the name of the region where it is produced, such that only the name "Danish Havarti" is protected, a proposal to which Danish producers are amenable. Danish producers contend it is domestically well known as a Danish cheese and knowledge of the cheese outside Denmark is "extremely limited". The CCFN urged the Trump administration to sanction the EU for its "abuses".

== See also ==
- Tilsit
- List of cheeses
