= Pays d'Auge =

Region in Normandy, France

Coordinates: 49°00′N 00°00′E

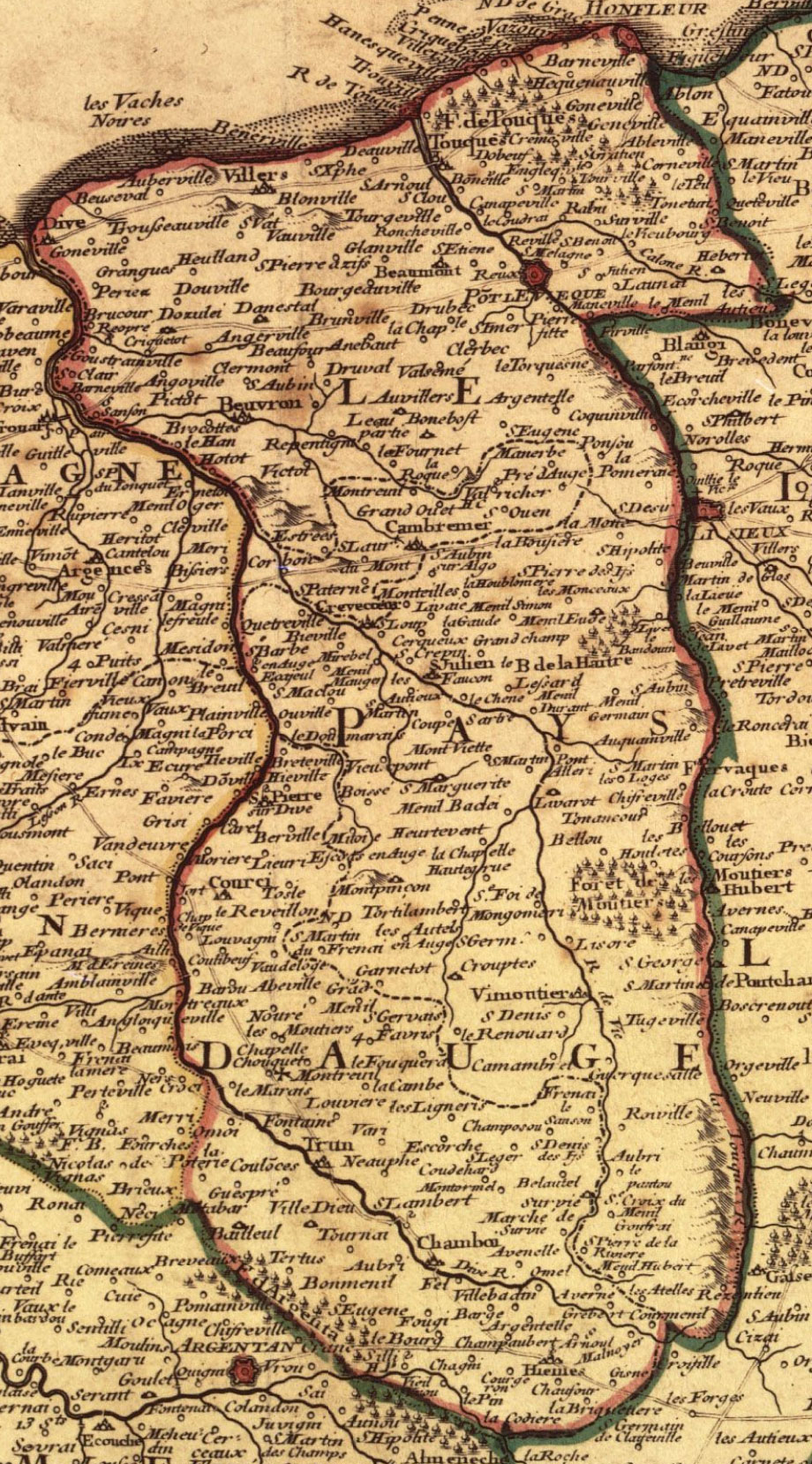
Map of the Pays d’Auge, 1716

The Pays d'Auge (French pronunciation: [pei doʒ], literally Land of Auge) is an area in Normandy, straddling the départements of Calvados and Orne (plus a small part of the territory of Eure). The chief town is Lisieux.

== Geography ==
Generally it consists of the basin of the Touques River.

The Pays d'Auge is divided into the following cantons: Canton of Cabourg, Canton of Dozulé, Canton of Trouville Deauville, Canton of Honfleur, Canton of Troarn, Canton of Cambremer, Canton of Pont-l'Évêque, Canton of Blangy-le-Château, Canton of Mézidon-Canon, Canton of Lisieux, Canton of Saint-Pierre-sur-Dives, Canton of Livarot, Canton of Orbec, Canton of Trun, Canton of Vimoutiers, Canton of Exmes and Canton of Gacé.

== Economy ==
The landscape of this area is considered typical of Normandy—agricultural and producing dairy produce and apples. It is noted for its cheeses, especially Camembert (named for a place in Pays d'Auge), Livarot and Pont-l'Évêque, also names of villages.

The Pays d'Auge has been granted appellation contrôlée status for its cider and calvados.

== Culture ==
The Norman dialect of the Pays d'Auge is known as Augeron. The Pays d'Auge is classed as a Land of Art and History by the national Ministry of Culture.

== See also ==
- Paul Bunel
