= Cornu helicopter =

Experimental helicopter built in France

Cornu helicopter No. II
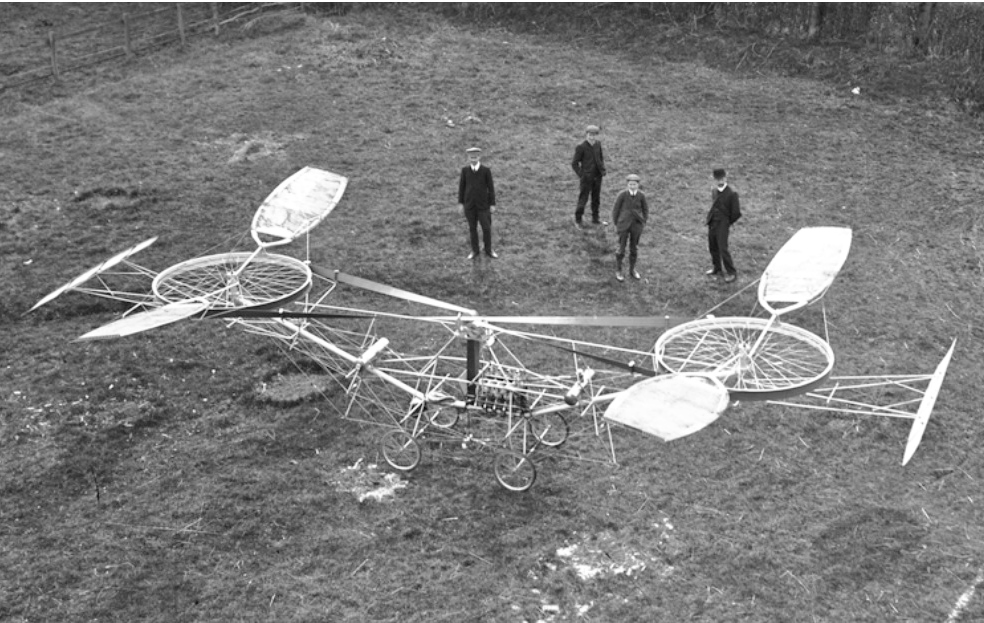

General information
- Type: Experimental aircraft
- Manufacturer: Paul Cornu
- Number built: 1

History
- First flight: 13 November 1907

The Cornu helicopter was an experimental helicopter built in France, and is widely credited with the first free flight of a rotary-wing aircraft when it took to the air on 13 November 1907. Built by bicycle-maker Paul Cornu, it was an open-framework structure built around a curved steel tube that carried a rotor at either end, and the engine and pilot in the middle. Power was transmitted to the rotors by a drive belt that linked both rotors and spun them in opposite directions. Control was to be provided by cables that could alter the pitch of the rotor blades, and by steerable vanes at either end of the machine intended to direct the downwash of the rotors.

The Cornu helicopter is reported to have made a number of short hops, rising perhaps 1.5 or 2 metres (5–7 feet) into the air and staying aloft for something less than one minute. This was long enough for Cornu to learn that the control systems he had designed were ineffective, and he abandoned the machine soon thereafter.

Modern engineering analyses have demonstrated that the Cornu helicopter could not have been capable of sustained flight. Nevertheless, in order to commemorate the centenary of his achievement, a replica of the helicopter was constructed by the École supérieure des techniques aéronautiques et de construction automobile (ESTACA) and presented to the Musée de l'Air et de l'Espace where it was placed on display on 15 December 2007.

A further replica was built by the Hubschraubermuseum Bückeburg (Helicopter Museum of Bückeburg) to pay homage to the merits of Paul Cornu. Since 13 November 2007 it is shown there.

== Specifications ==
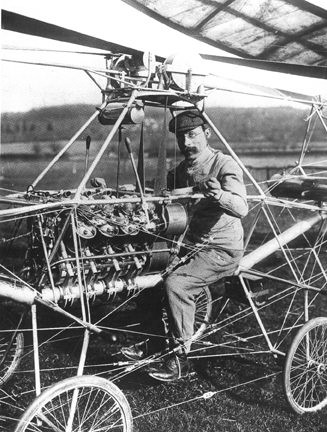
Paul Cornu in his open frame helicopter

General characteristics

- Crew: One pilot
- Gross weight: 260 kg (573 lb)
- Powerplant: 1 × Antoinette , 18 kW (24 hp)
- Main rotor diameter: 2 × 6.00 m (19 ft 8 in)
- Main rotor area: 56.5 m^{2} (608 sq ft)

Performance

- Cruise speed: 0 km/h (0 mph, 0 kn)
- Endurance: 0 hours 0.5 minutes
- Service ceiling: 2.0 m (7.0 ft)
