= Bocquencé =

- Part of La Ferté-en-Ouche
- Location of Bocquencé
- Location within France Location within Normandy
- Coordinates: 48°50′05″N 0°28′01″E
- Country: France
- Region: Normandy
- Department: Orne
- Arrondissement: Mortagne-au-Perche
- Canton: Rai
- Commune: La Ferté-en-Ouche
- Area^{1}: 10.15 km^{2} (3.92 sq mi)
- Elevation: 210 m (690 ft)
- Highest elevation: 283 m (928 ft)
- Lowest elevation: 202 m (663 ft)
- Population (2023): 139
  - Density: 13.7/km^{2} (35.5/sq mi)
- Time zone: UTC+01:00 (CET)
  - Summer (DST): UTC+02:00 (CEST)
- Postal code: 61550
- ^{1} French Land Register data, which excludes lakes, ponds, glaciers > 1 km^{2} (0.386 sq mi or 247 acres) and river estuaries.

Bocquencé (French pronunciation: [bɔkɑ̃se]) is a former commune in the Orne department in northwestern France. On 1 January 2016, it was merged into the new commune of La Ferté-en-Ouche.

== See also ==
- Communes of the Orne department
