= Monnai =

- Part of La Ferté-en-Ouche
- Location of Monnai
- Location within France Location within Normandy
- Coordinates: 48°53′34″N 0°23′54″E
- Country: France
- Region: Normandy
- Department: Orne
- Arrondissement: Mortagne-au-Perche
- Canton: Rai
- Commune: La Ferté-en-Ouche
- Area^{1}: 15.52 km^{2} (5.99 sq mi)
- Elevation: 242 m (794 ft)
- Highest elevation: 262 m (860 ft)
- Lowest elevation: 191 m (627 ft)
- Population (2022): 244
  - Density: 15.7/km^{2} (40.7/sq mi)
- Time zone: UTC+01:00 (CET)
  - Summer (DST): UTC+02:00 (CEST)
- Postal code: 61470
- ^{1} French Land Register data, which excludes lakes, ponds, glaciers > 1 km^{2} (0.386 sq mi or 247 acres) and river estuaries.

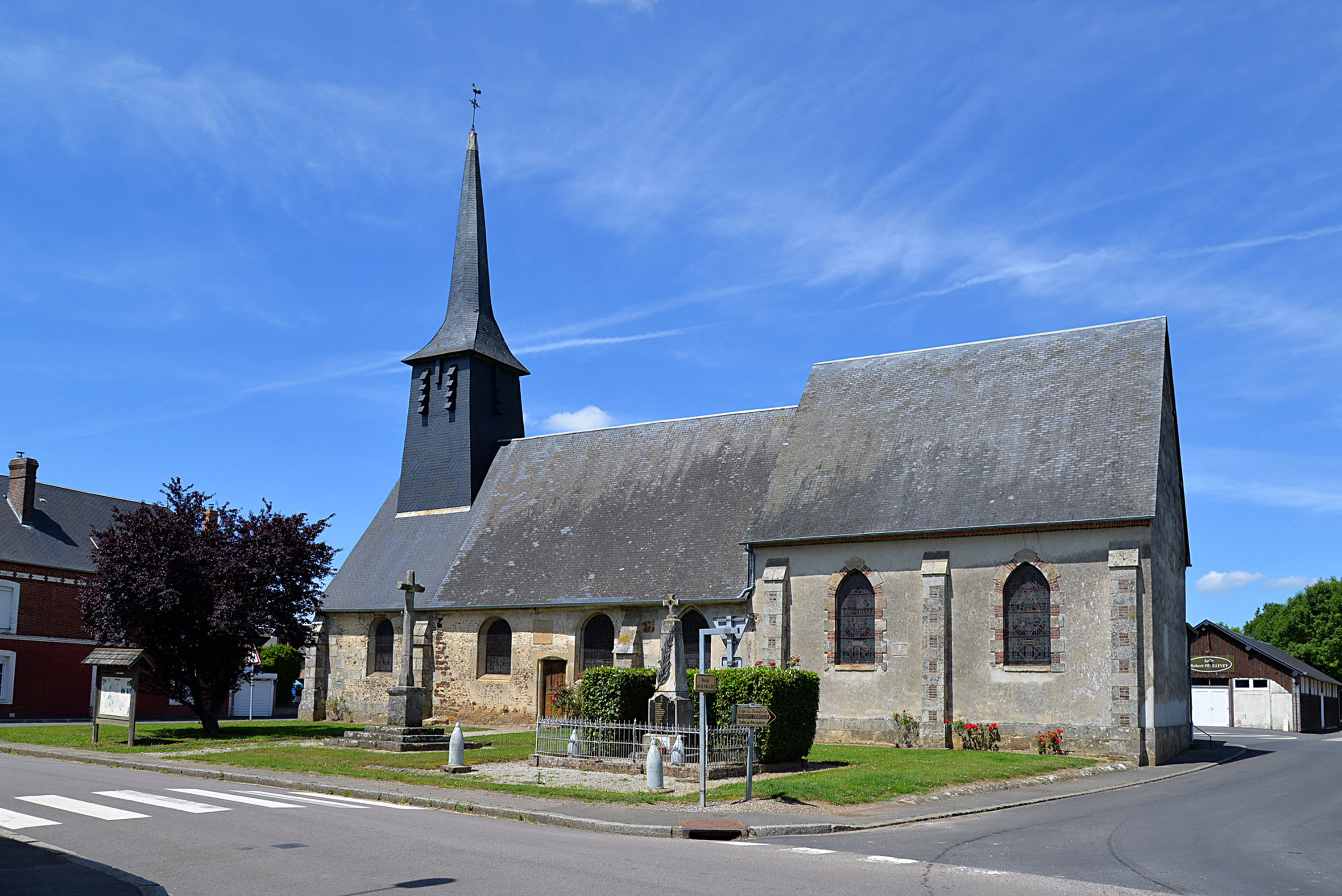
Église Saint-Sauveur de Monnai

Monnai (French pronunciation: [mɔnɛ]) is a former commune in the Orne department in north-western France. On 1 January 2016, it was merged into the new commune of La Ferté-en-Ouche. It had a population of 244 as of 2022.

== History ==
The village was founded as "Moenai" in 1100. Following the tradition, the chapel Notre-Dame-du-Vallet was built after the discovery of a statue; it was rebuilt in 16th century and again in 1862. The old village of Ternant, mentioned for the first time in 1100, was linked to Monnai.

In 2005, the "Carrefour des Cultures" 5-day international gathering occurred in Monnai.

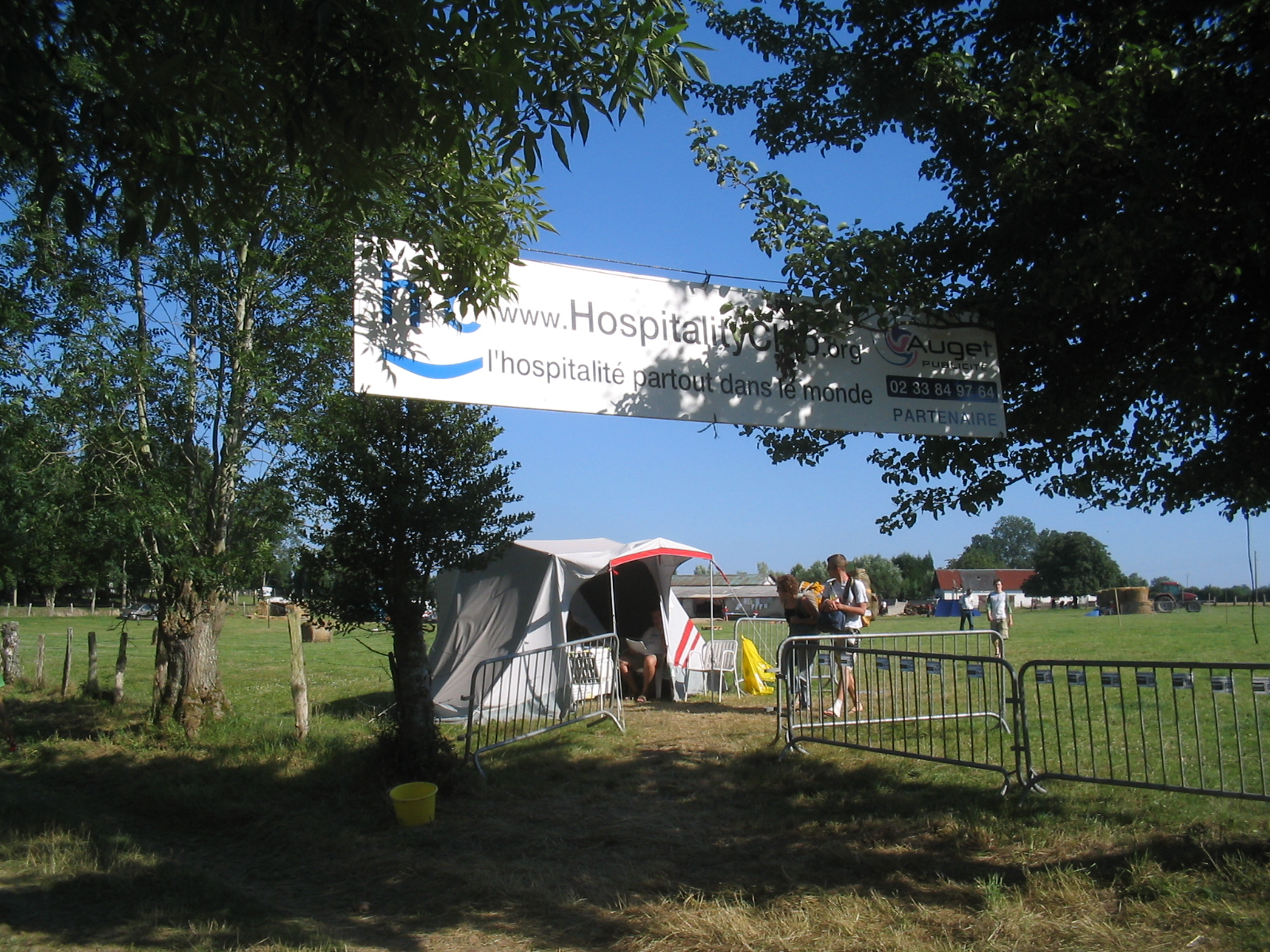
Entrance to the Carrefour des Cultures in Monnai. Banner reads: Hospitality throughout the world

== See also ==
- Communes of the Orne department
