= Paul Bunel =

- Born: January 12, 1882; La Ferté Fresnel, France
- Died: October 20, 1918 (aged 36); Vouziers
- Cause of death: Killed in battle
- Known for: Photographer
- Spouse: Fernande Honorine Sagat

Paul Bunel (Jan 21,1882 - Oct 20,1918) was a Norman photographer.

Born in La Ferté Fresnel, France Bunel settled in Vimoutiers from where he traversed the Pays d'Auge in Lower Normandy, France, to photograph villages, people and Norman costumes of the beginning of the 20th century. From his photographs, he made postcards that become a testimony of the past.
