= Saint-Nicolas-des-Laitiers =

- Part of La Ferté-en-Ouche
- Location of Saint-Nicolas-des-Laitiers
- Location within France Location within Normandy
- Coordinates: 48°50′12″N 0°25′20″E
- Country: France
- Region: Normandy
- Department: Orne
- Arrondissement: Mortagne-au-Perche
- Canton: Rai
- Commune: La Ferté-en-Ouche
- Area^{1}: 7.09 km^{2} (2.74 sq mi)
- Elevation: 253 m (830 ft)
- Highest elevation: 294 m (965 ft)
- Lowest elevation: 222 m (728 ft)
- Population (2022): 76
  - Density: 11/km^{2} (28/sq mi)
- Time zone: UTC+01:00 (CET)
  - Summer (DST): UTC+02:00 (CEST)
- Postal code: 61550
- ^{1} French Land Register data, which excludes lakes, ponds, glaciers > 1 km^{2} (0.386 sq mi or 247 acres) and river estuaries.

Saint-Nicolas-des-Laitiers (French pronunciation: [sɛ̃ nikɔla de lɛtje]) is a former commune in the Orne department in north-western France. On 1 January 2016, it was merged into the new commune of La Ferté-en-Ouche.

== See also ==
- Communes of the Orne department
