= Mondseer =

Austrian cheese

Mondseer, also known as Mondseer Schachtelkäse (English: Mondseer box cheese) when sold in smaller portions in "small wooden boxes", is an Austrian semi-hard, washed-rind cheese.

== History ==
There are varying accounts of Mondseer's origin. It has been stated that the cheese has been existent in the Salzburg area since 1818, with a likelihood that it may have been first produced in the Castle of Hüttenstein. According to this account, the cheese's name of "Mondseer" was first used in 1955, and prior to that was simply referred to as "box cheese".

Another account holds that production of Mondseer began in 1830, and that it was named after the monastery in Mondsee, Austria.

== Description ==
Mondseer is a disk-shaped cheese made from pasteurized whole or part-skim cow's milk. It is a semi-hard semi-hard cheese with a smooth and creamy texture and slotted holes, similar to Munster cheese or Limburger. The surface is brushed by hand with salt water and smeared with red cultures during the aging process, which results in a yellow-reddish rind forming on its surface. Its maturation takes three to six weeks, and its fat content is 45%. It has a mild to slightly pungent aroma and a sweet and sour, somewhat acidic and sharp flavor. Usually, cheeses of one kilogram are produced.

== See also ==
- Austrian cuisine
- List of cheeses
