= Glos-la-Ferrière =

- Part of La Ferté-en-Ouche
- Location of Glos-la-Ferrière
- Location within France Location within Normandy
- Coordinates: 48°51′28″N 0°36′07″E
- Country: France
- Region: Normandy
- Department: Orne
- Arrondissement: Mortagne-au-Perche
- Canton: Rai
- Commune: La Ferté-en-Ouche
- Area^{1}: 12.63 km^{2} (4.88 sq mi)
- Elevation: 265 m (869 ft)
- Highest elevation: 261 m (856 ft)
- Lowest elevation: 208 m (682 ft)
- Population (2022): 487
  - Density: 38.6/km^{2} (99.9/sq mi)
- Time zone: UTC+01:00 (CET)
  - Summer (DST): UTC+02:00 (CEST)
- Postal code: 61550
- ^{1} French Land Register data, which excludes lakes, ponds, glaciers > 1 km^{2} (0.386 sq mi or 247 acres) and river estuaries.

Glos-la-Ferrière (French pronunciation: [ɡlo la fɛʁjɛʁ]) is a former commune in the Orne department in north-western France. On 1 January 2016, it was merged into the new commune of La Ferté-en-Ouche.

== See also ==
- Communes of the Orne department
