= La Ferté =

La Ferté is a French toponym meaning "fortress" or "bastion".

It is the name or part of the name of several communes in France:

- La Ferté, Jura, in the Jura Department
- La Ferté-Alais, in the Essonne Department
- La Ferté-Beauharnais, in the Loir-et-Cher Department
- La Ferté-Bernard, in the Sarthe Department
- La Ferté-Chevresis, in the Aisne Department
- La Ferté-Frênel, in the Orne Department
- La Ferté-Gaucher, in the Seine-et-Marne Department
- La Ferté-Hauterive, in the Allier Department
- La Ferté-Imbault, in the Loir-et-Cher Department
- La Ferté-Loupière, in the Yonne Department
- La Ferté-Macé, in the Orne Department
- La Ferté-Milon, in the Aisne Department
- La Ferté-Saint-Aubin, formerly La Ferté-Nabert, in the Loiret Department
- La Ferté-Saint-Cyr, in the Loir-et-Cher Department
- La Ferté-Saint-Samson, in the Seine-Maritime Department
- La Ferté-sous-Jouarre, in the Seine-et-Marne Department
- La Ferté-sur-Chiers, in the Ardennes Department
- La Ferté-Vidame, in the Eure-et-Loir Department
- La Ferté-Villeneuil, in the Eure-et-Loir Department
- Ville-sous-la-Ferté, in the Aube Department
- La Ferté Abbey, a Cistercian abbey in La-Ferté-sur-Grosne in the commune of Saint-Ambreuil, Saône-et-Loire Department

== See also ==
- Laferté-sur-Amance, in the Haute-Marne Department
- Laferté-sur-Aube, in the Haute-Marne Department
