= Villers-en-Ouche =

- Part of La Ferté-en-Ouche
- Location of Villers-en-Ouche
- Location within France Location within Normandy
- Coordinates: 48°51′39″N 0°27′23″E
- Country: France
- Region: Normandy
- Department: Orne
- Arrondissement: Mortagne-au-Perche
- Canton: Rai
- Commune: La Ferté-en-Ouche
- Area^{1}: 11.13 km^{2} (4.30 sq mi)
- Elevation: 250 m (820 ft)
- Highest elevation: 257 m (843 ft)
- Lowest elevation: 197 m (646 ft)
- Population (2022): 316
  - Density: 28.4/km^{2} (73.5/sq mi)
- Time zone: UTC+01:00 (CET)
  - Summer (DST): UTC+02:00 (CEST)
- Postal code: 61550
- ^{1} French Land Register data, which excludes lakes, ponds, glaciers > 1 km^{2} (0.386 sq mi or 247 acres) and river estuaries.

Villers-en-Ouche (French pronunciation: [vilɛʁ ɑ̃.n‿uʃ], literally Villers in Ouche) is a former commune in the Orne department in north-western France. On 1 January 2016, it was merged into the new commune of La Ferté-en-Ouche.

== See also ==
- Communes of the Orne department
