= Paul Cornu =

French engineer

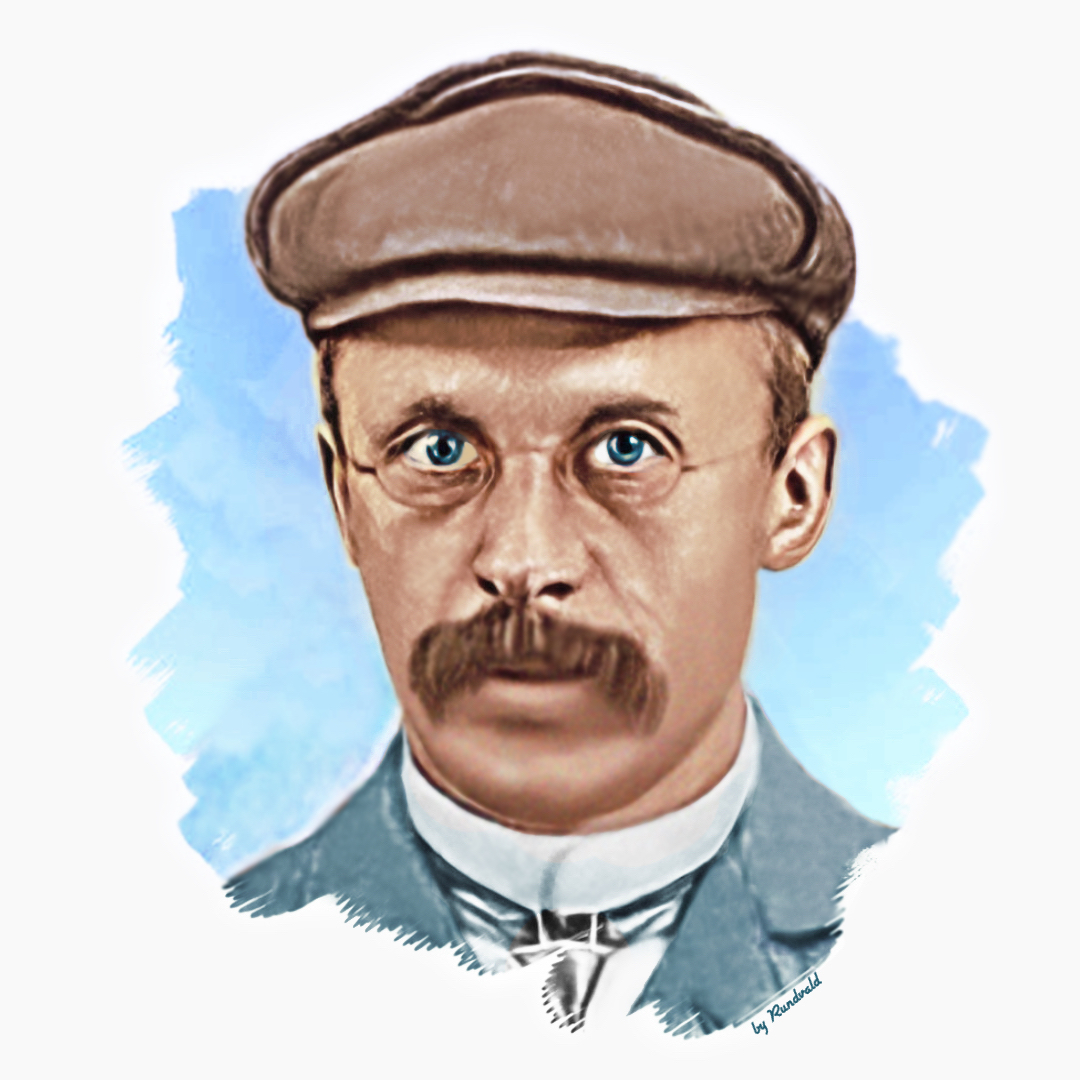
- Paul Cornu, helicopter pioneer.
- Born: 15 June 1881; Glos-la-Ferrière
- Died: 6 June 1944 (aged 62); Lisieux
- Occupation: Engineer

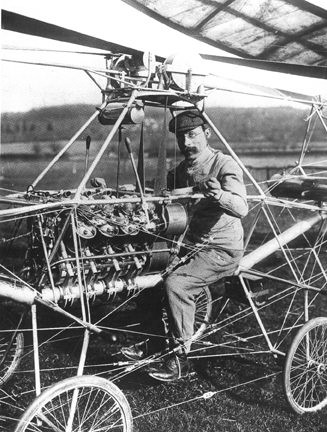
French engineer Paul Cornu in his first helicopter in 1907. Note that he is sitting between the two rotors, which rotated in opposite directions to cancel torque. This helicopter was the first flying machine to have risen from the ground using rotor blades instead of wings.

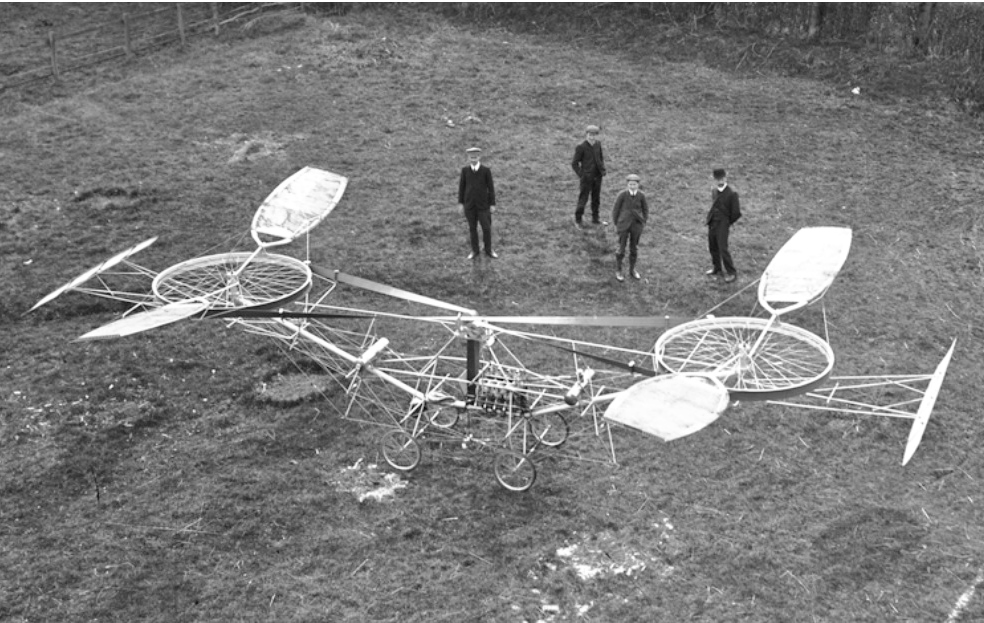
Full length photograph of the Cornu helicopter.

Paul Cornu (French pronunciation: [pɔl kɔʁny]; 15 June 1881 – 6 June 1944) was a French engineer.

== Life ==
Paul Cornu was born in Glos-la-Ferrière, France and was one of thirteen children. At a young age, he helped his father in his transports company. He made history by designing the world's first successful manned rotary wing aircraft.

Cornu first built an unmanned experimental design powered by a 2 hp Buchet engine.

His manned helicopter was powered by a 24 horsepower (18 kW) Antoinette engine. He piloted this construction himself in Normandy, France on 13 November 1907. Previously, a French helicopter, the Breguet-Richet Gyroplane I, had managed to lift off under its own power, but it had been held in position by men standing on the ground. Cornu's performance was a considerable progress because his aircraft flew without additional support and lifted Cornu about 30 cm (1 ft) for 20 seconds. Unfortunately this early helicopter was scarcely maneuverable and had only a few additional flights. The construction was not much further developed by this technical pioneer, who had to keep on making a living by manufacturing bicycles.

== Death ==
In 1944 Paul Cornu was killed in Lisieux, France, when his home was destroyed during the bombardment by the Allies that accompanied the Normandy landings of World War II. He was 62 years old.
