= La Ferté-en-Ouche =

- Commune
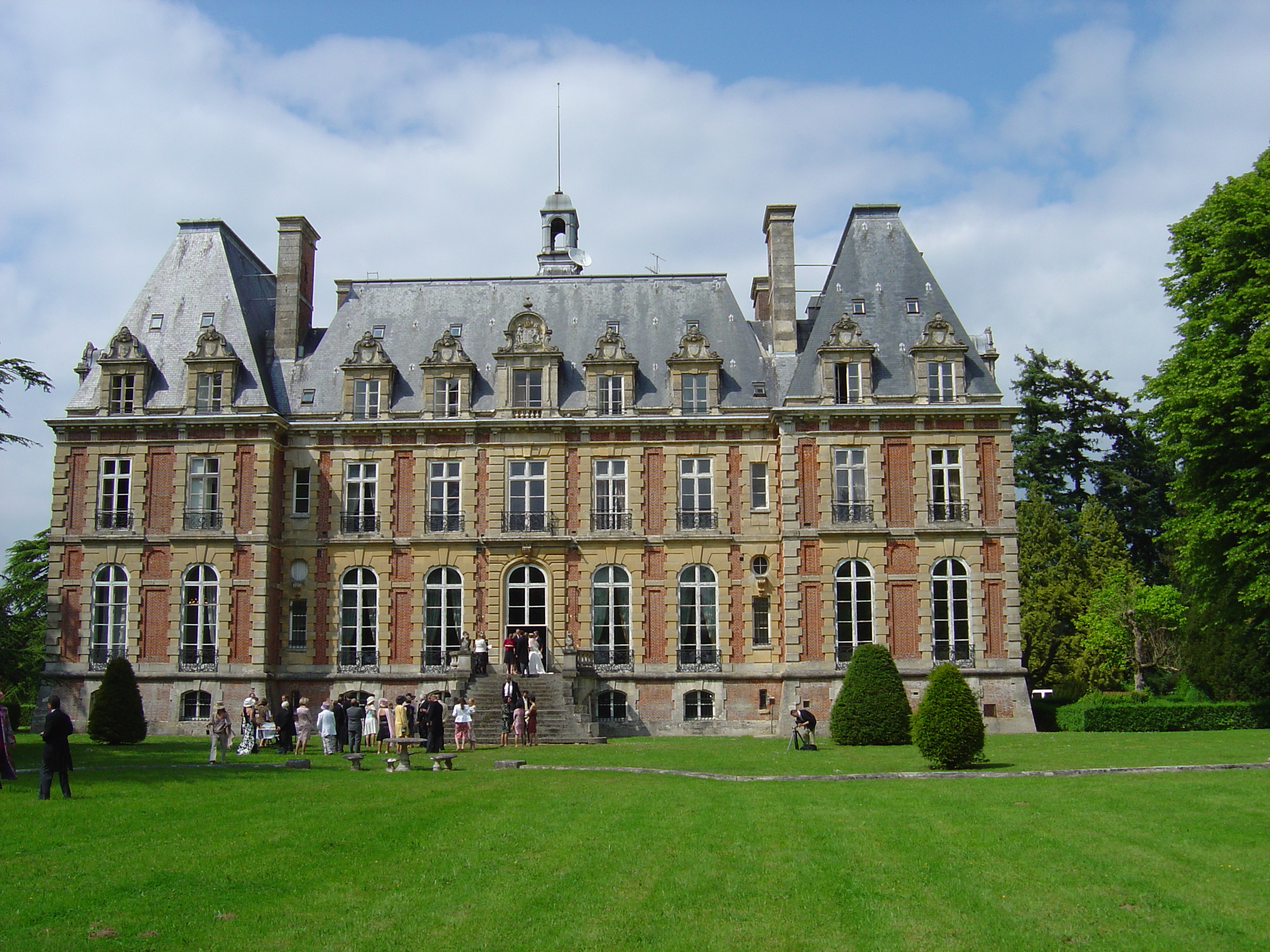
- The chateau in La Ferté-Frênel
- Location of La Ferté-en-Ouche
- Location within France Location within Normandy
- Coordinates: 48°50′28″N 0°30′40″E
- Country: France
- Region: Normandy
- Department: Orne
- Arrondissement: Mortagne-au-Perche
- Canton: Rai

Government
  - Mayor (2020–2026): Michel Le Glaunec
- Area^{1}: 131.69 km^{2} (50.85 sq mi)
- Population (2023): 2,938
  - Density: 22.31/km^{2} (57.78/sq mi)
- Time zone: UTC+01:00 (CET)
  - Summer (DST): UTC+02:00 (CEST)
- INSEE/Postal code: 61167 /61550, 61470
- ^{1} French Land Register data, which excludes lakes, ponds, glaciers > 1 km^{2} (0.386 sq mi or 247 acres) and river estuaries.

La Ferté-en-Ouche (French pronunciation: [la fɛʁte ɑ̃.n‿uʃ], literally La Ferté in Ouche) is a commune in the department of Orne, northwestern France. The municipality was established on 1 January 2016 by merger of the former communes of Anceins, Bocquencé, Couvains, La Ferté-Frênel (the seat), Gauville, Glos-la-Ferrière, Heugon, Monnai, Saint-Nicolas-des-Laitiers and Villers-en-Ouche.

== Geography ==
La Ferté-en-Ouche is made up of the following collection of villages and hamlets, Marnefer, La Toupansière, Le Douet-Arthus, Anceins, La Ferté-en-Ouche, La Chatière, Couvains, Glos-la-Ferrière, Heugon, Le Bois Renoult, Saint-Nicolas-des-Laitiers, Bocquencé, Le Bois de la ville, Gauville, Le Biot and Le Bois Gaudry.

The commune along with another 69 communes shares part of a 4,747 hectare, Natura 2000 conservation area, called Risle, Guiel, Charentonne.

Three rivers, La Guiel, La Charentonne and the Touquettes pass through the commune. In addition two streams Ruisseau de Brequigny and Ruisseau des Vaux flow through the commune.

== Population ==
Population data refer to the area corresponding with the commune as of January 2025.

Historical population
Year	Pop.	±% p.a.
1968	3,157	—
1975	2,887	−1.27%
1982	2,937	+0.25%
1990	2,940	+0.01%
1999	2,989	+0.18%
2007	3,292	+1.21%
2012	3,265	−0.16%
2017	3,217	−0.30%
2023	2,938	−1.50%
Source: INSEE

== Notable buildings and places ==
=== National heritage sites ===
The commune has 6 buildings and areas listed as a Monument historique

- Chateau of La Ferté-Frênel is a 19th-century chateau, which with its garden and grounds is classed as a Monument historique.
- Château du Boële is an 18th-century chateau, based in Glos-la-Ferrière and classed as a Monument historique in 1974.
- Church of Douet-Arthus is a 12th-century church, based in Heugon and classed as a Monument historique in 1997.
- Menhir at Glos-la-Ferrière is a Neolithic menhir in Glos-la-Ferrière and was classed as a Monument historique in 1944.
- Dolmen at La Ferté-Frênel is a Neolithic dolmen in La Ferté-Frênel and was classed as a Monument historique in 1944.
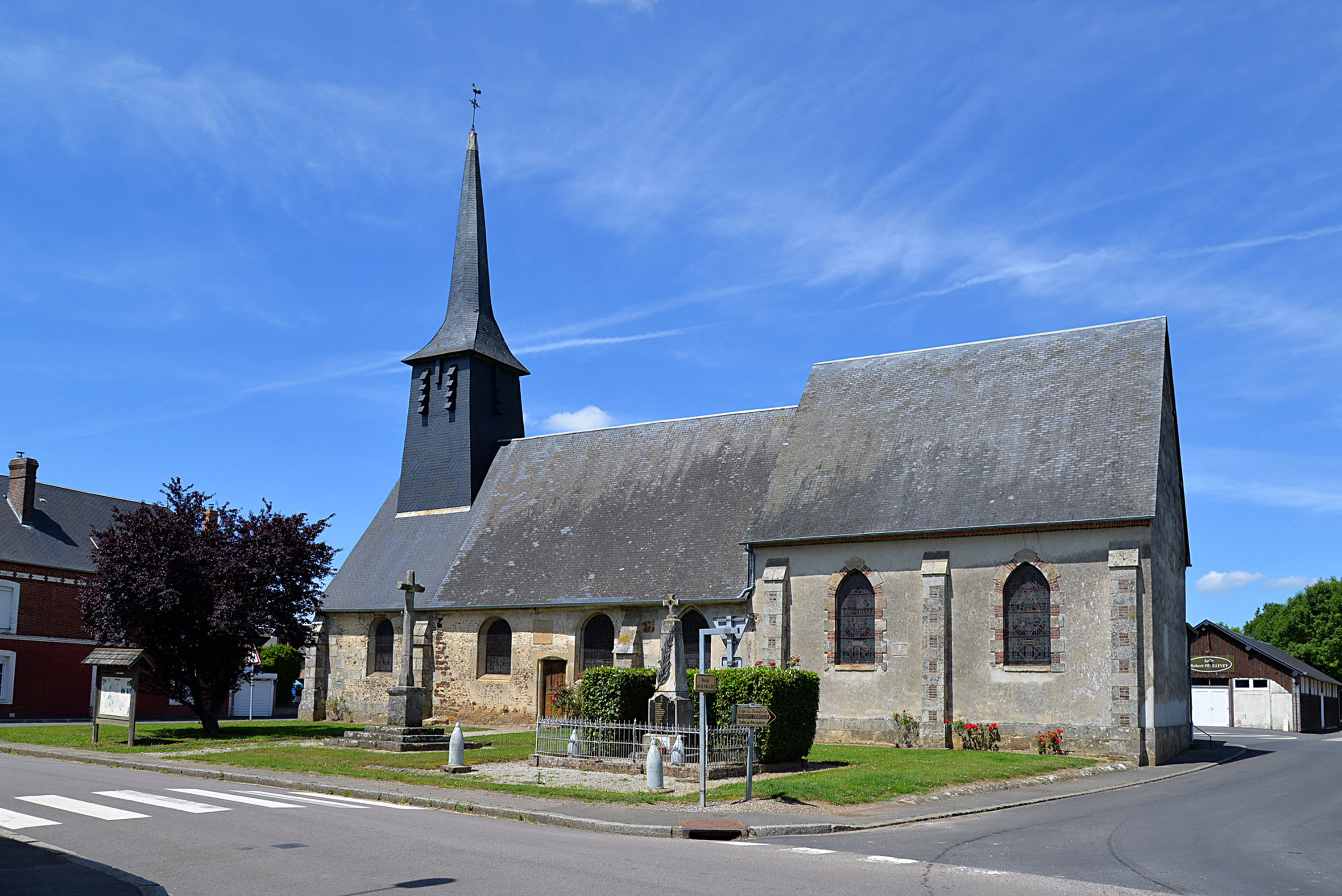
Saint-Sauveur church in Monnai

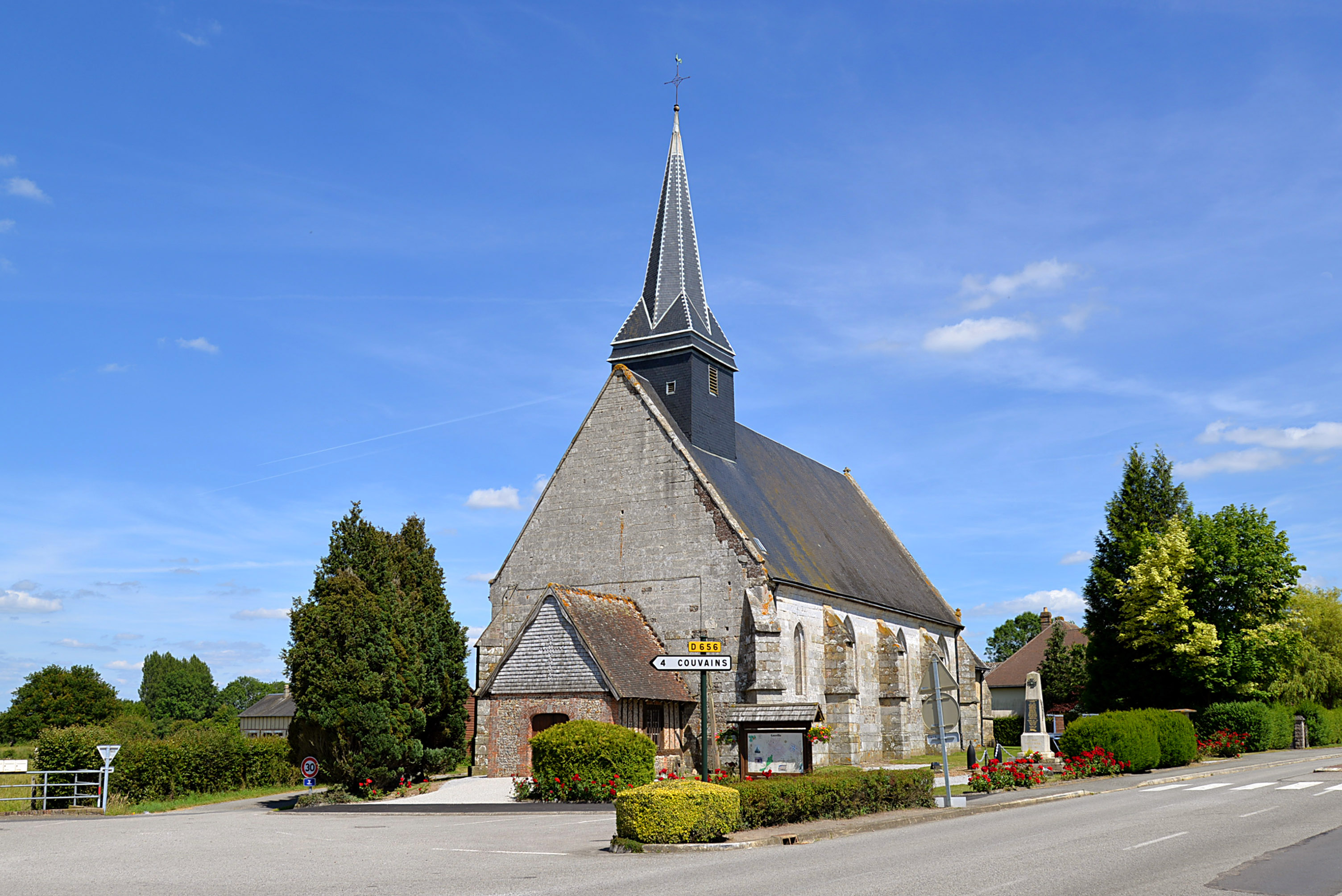
Saint-Aubin church in Gauville

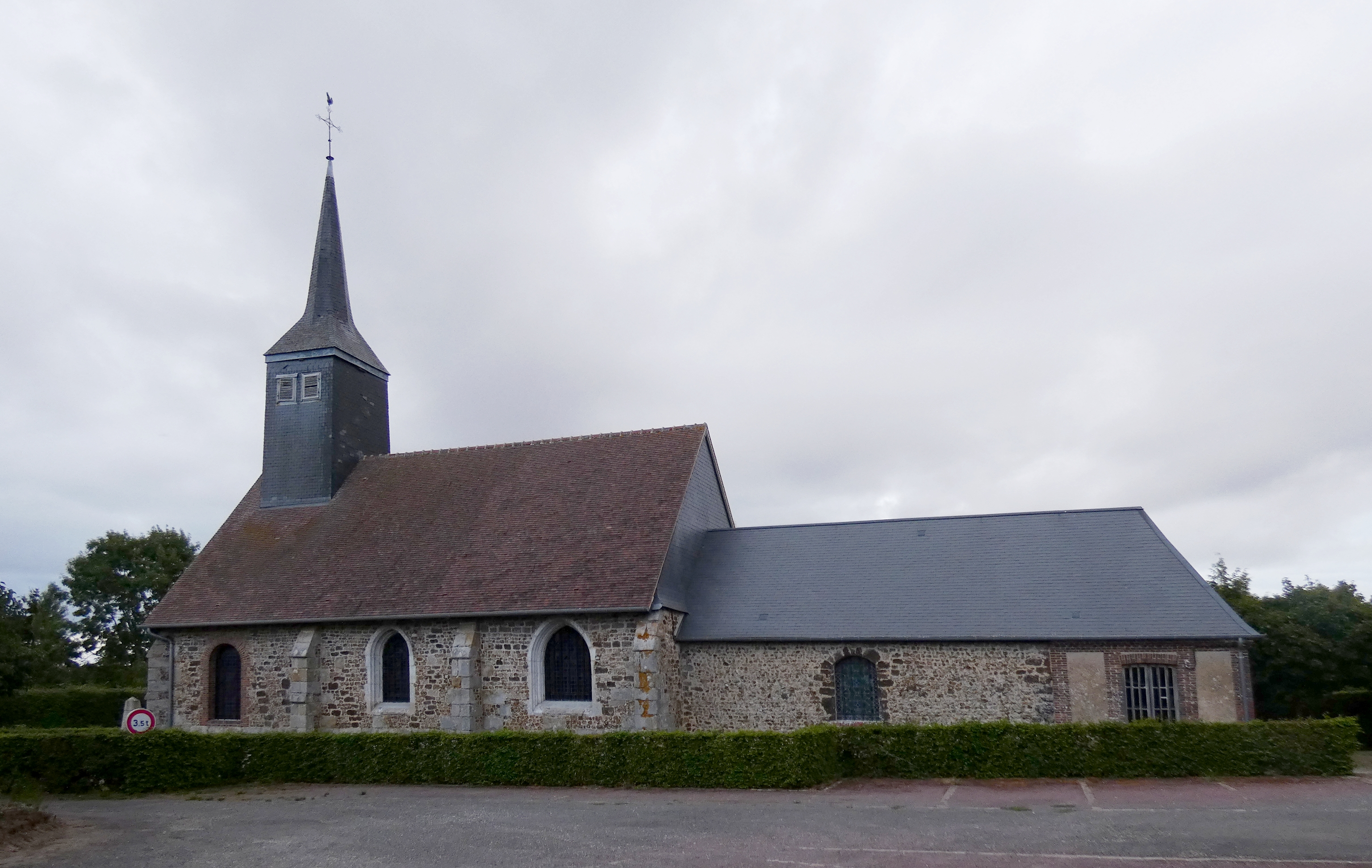
Couvains church

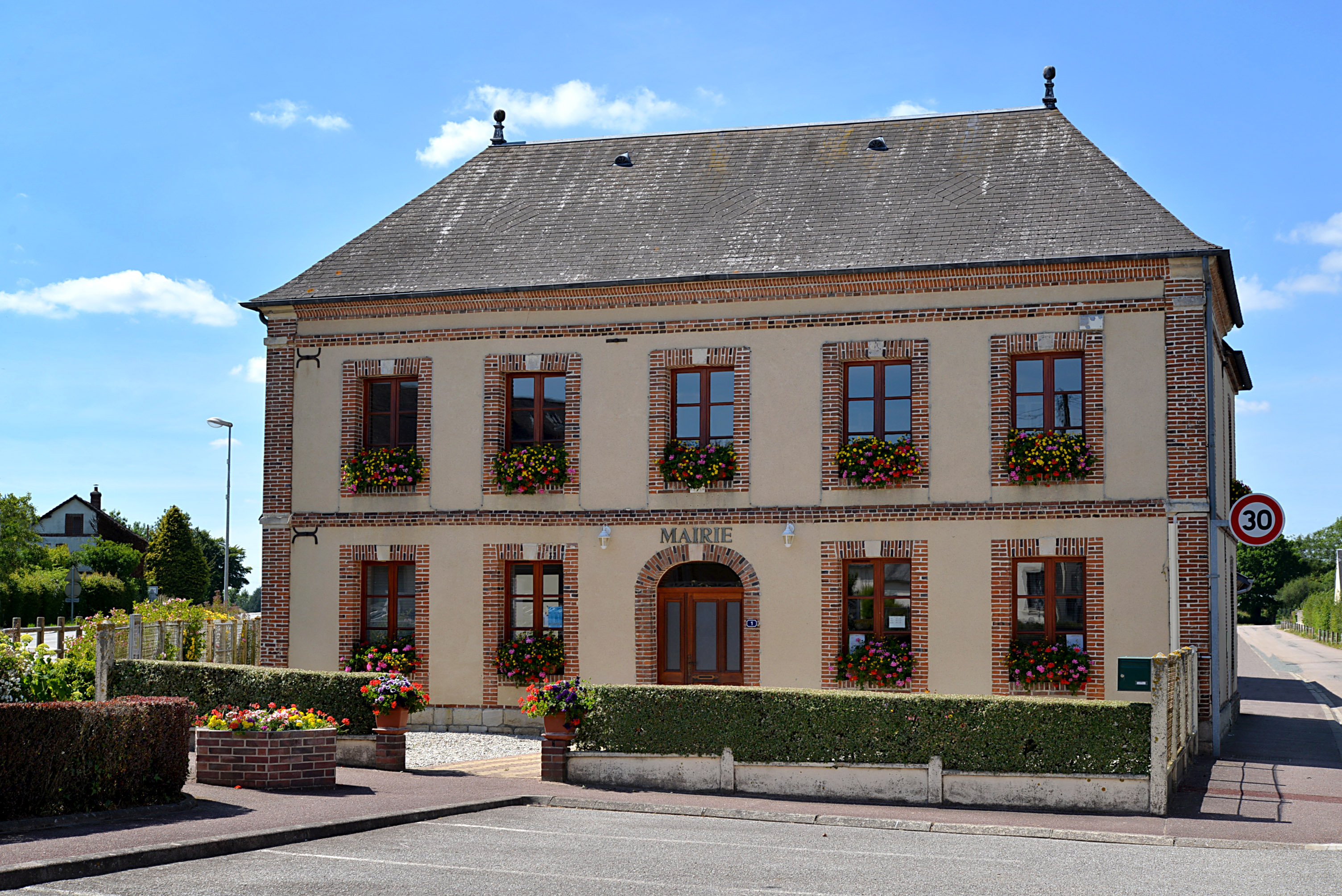
Town Hall of Gauville

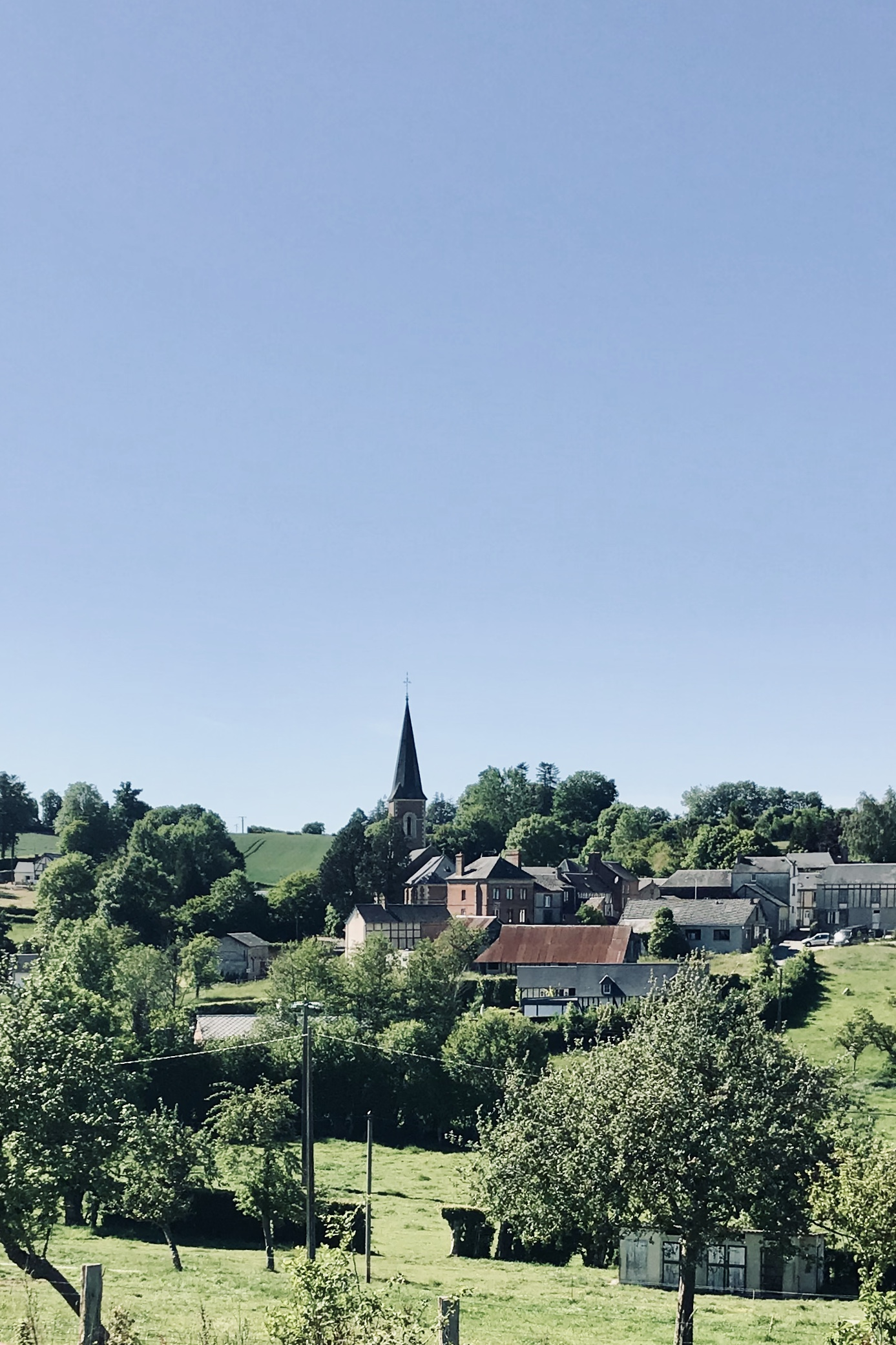
Heugon

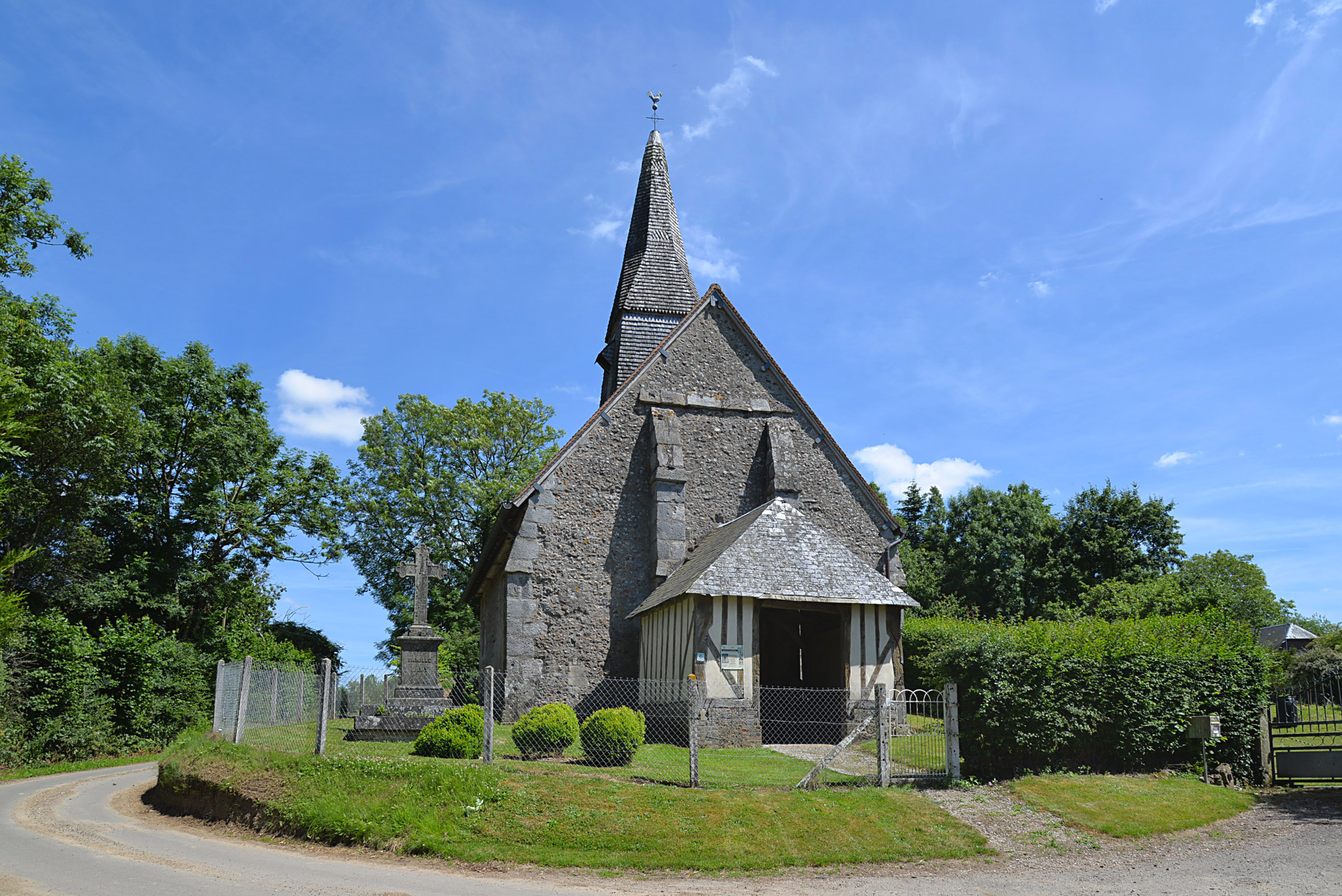
Church of Saint-Pierre-et-Saint-Denis in Heugon

== People linked with the commune ==
- Émile Bouhours (1870–1953), a French former road bicycle racer who won the 1900 Paris–Roubaix race was born here.
- Paul Bunel (1882–1918), a Norman photographer was born here.
- Paul Cornu (1881 – 1944) an engineer who was born here.

== See also ==
- Communes of the Orne department
