= Heugon =

- Part of La Ferté-en-Ouche
- Location of Heugon
- Location within France Location within Normandy
- Coordinates: 48°51′22″N 0°23′55″E
- Country: France
- Region: Normandy
- Department: Orne
- Arrondissement: Mortagne-au-Perche
- Canton: Rai
- Commune: La Ferté-en-Ouche
- Area^{1}: 15.70 km^{2} (6.06 sq mi)
- Elevation: 250 m (820 ft)
- Highest elevation: 277 m (909 ft)
- Lowest elevation: 203 m (666 ft)
- Population (2022): 195
  - Density: 12.4/km^{2} (32.2/sq mi)
- Demonym: Heugonais
- Time zone: UTC+01:00 (CET)
  - Summer (DST): UTC+02:00 (CEST)
- Postal code: 61470
- ^{1} French Land Register data, which excludes lakes, ponds, glaciers > 1 km^{2} (0.386 sq mi or 247 acres) and river estuaries.

Heugon (French pronunciation: [øɡɔ̃]) is a former commune in the Orne department in north-western France. On 1 January 2016, it was merged into the new commune of La Ferté-en-Ouche.

== See also ==
- Communes of the Orne department
