= Gauville, Orne =

Gauville
- Part of La Ferté-en-Ouche
- Location of Gauville
- Location within France Location within Normandy
- Coordinates: 48°49′47″N 0°33′18″E
- Country: France
- Region: Normandy
- Department: Orne
- Arrondissement: Mortagne-au-Perche
- Canton: Rai
- Commune: La Ferté-en-Ouche
- Area^{1}: 21.51 km^{2} (8.31 sq mi)
- Elevation: 268 m (879 ft)
- Highest elevation: 299 m (981 ft)
- Lowest elevation: 247 m (810 ft)
- Population (2022): 533
  - Density: 24.8/km^{2} (64.2/sq mi)
- Time zone: UTC+01:00 (CET)
  - Summer (DST): UTC+02:00 (CEST)
- Postal code: 61550
- ^{1} French Land Register data, which excludes lakes, ponds, glaciers > 1 km^{2} (0.386 sq mi or 247 acres) and river estuaries.

Gauville (French pronunciation: [ɡovil]) is a former commune in the Orne department in north-western France. On 1 January 2016, it was merged into the new commune of La Ferté-en-Ouche. Maire de Gauville: Michel Le Glaunec (2014 jusqu'a 20?), Bernard Masse (1993,2014).

== See also ==
- Communes of the Orne department
