= Couvains, Orne =

Couvains
- Part of La Ferté-en-Ouche
- Location of Couvains
- Location within France Location within Normandy
- Coordinates: 48°51′39″N 0°33′36″E
- Country: France
- Region: Normandy
- Department: Orne
- Arrondissement: Mortagne-au-Perche
- Canton: Rai
- Commune: La Ferté-en-Ouche
- Area^{1}: 17.93 km^{2} (6.92 sq mi)
- Elevation: 230 m (750 ft)
- Highest elevation: 259 m (850 ft)
- Lowest elevation: 204 m (669 ft)
- Population (2022): 189
  - Density: 10.5/km^{2} (27.3/sq mi)
- Time zone: UTC+01:00 (CET)
  - Summer (DST): UTC+02:00 (CEST)
- Postal code: 61550
- ^{1} French Land Register data, which excludes lakes, ponds, glaciers > 1 km^{2} (0.386 sq mi or 247 acres) and river estuaries.

Couvains (French pronunciation: [kuvɛ̃]) is a former commune in the Orne department in north-western France. On 1 January 2016, it was merged into the new commune of La Ferté-en-Ouche.

== See also ==
- Communes of the Orne department
