= Mondsee (town) =

- Municipality
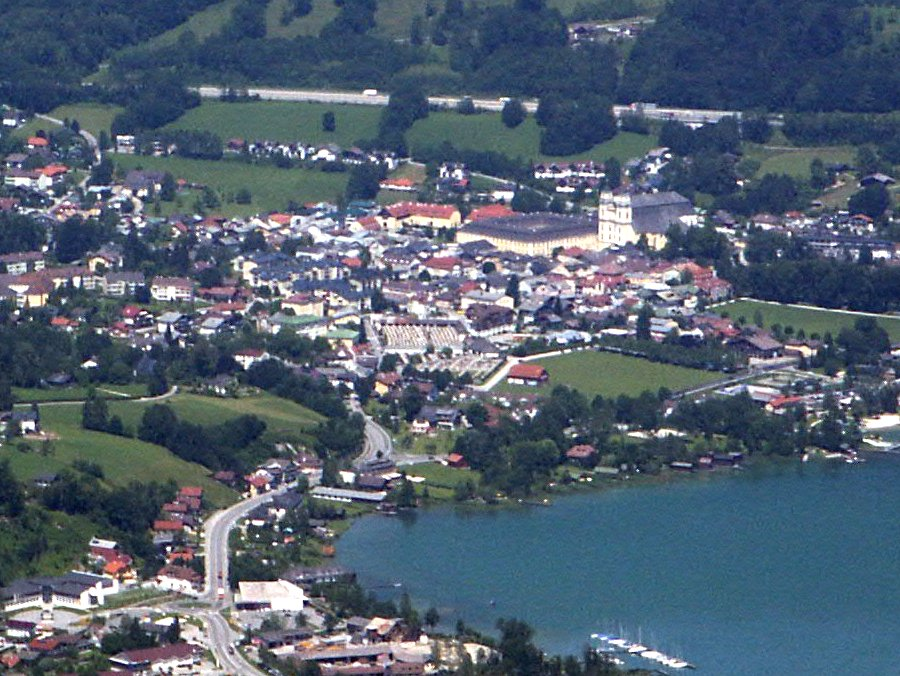

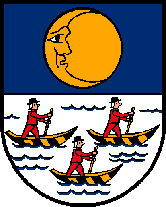
- Coat of arms

- Location within Austria
- Coordinates: 47°51′24″N 13°21′06″E
- Country: Austria
- State: Upper Austria
- District: Vöcklabruck

Government
  - Mayor: Otto Mierl (ÖVP)

Area
  - Total: 16.62 km^{2} (6.42 sq mi)
- Elevation: 493 m (1,617 ft)

Population (2018-01-01)
  - Total: 3,734
  - Density: 224.7/km^{2} (581.9/sq mi)
- Time zone: UTC+1 (CET)
  - Summer (DST): UTC+2 (CEST)
- Postal code: 5310
- Area code: 06232
- Vehicle registration: VB

Mondsee is a town in the Vöcklabruck district in the Austrian state of Upper Austria located on the shore of the lake Mondsee. The town is home to the medieval Mondsee Abbey, whose cloister church was used for the site of the wedding in The Sound of Music.

The town is also known for the SKGLB railway museum and for prehistoric pile-dwelling (or stilt house) settlements at Mondsee, which are part of UNESCO World Heritage Sites.

One of its past sons is Alexander Strähuber (1814–1882), the history painter and book illustrator, and from 1865 to 1882 professor at the Munich Royal Academy of Fine Arts.

== Population ==
Historical population
Year	Pop.	±%
1991	2,600	—
2001	3,207	+23.3%
2009	3,304	+3.0%

== Neighbouring municipalities ==
- Unterach am Attersee
- Tiefgraben
- Innerschwand
- Sankt Lorenz

== Gallery ==
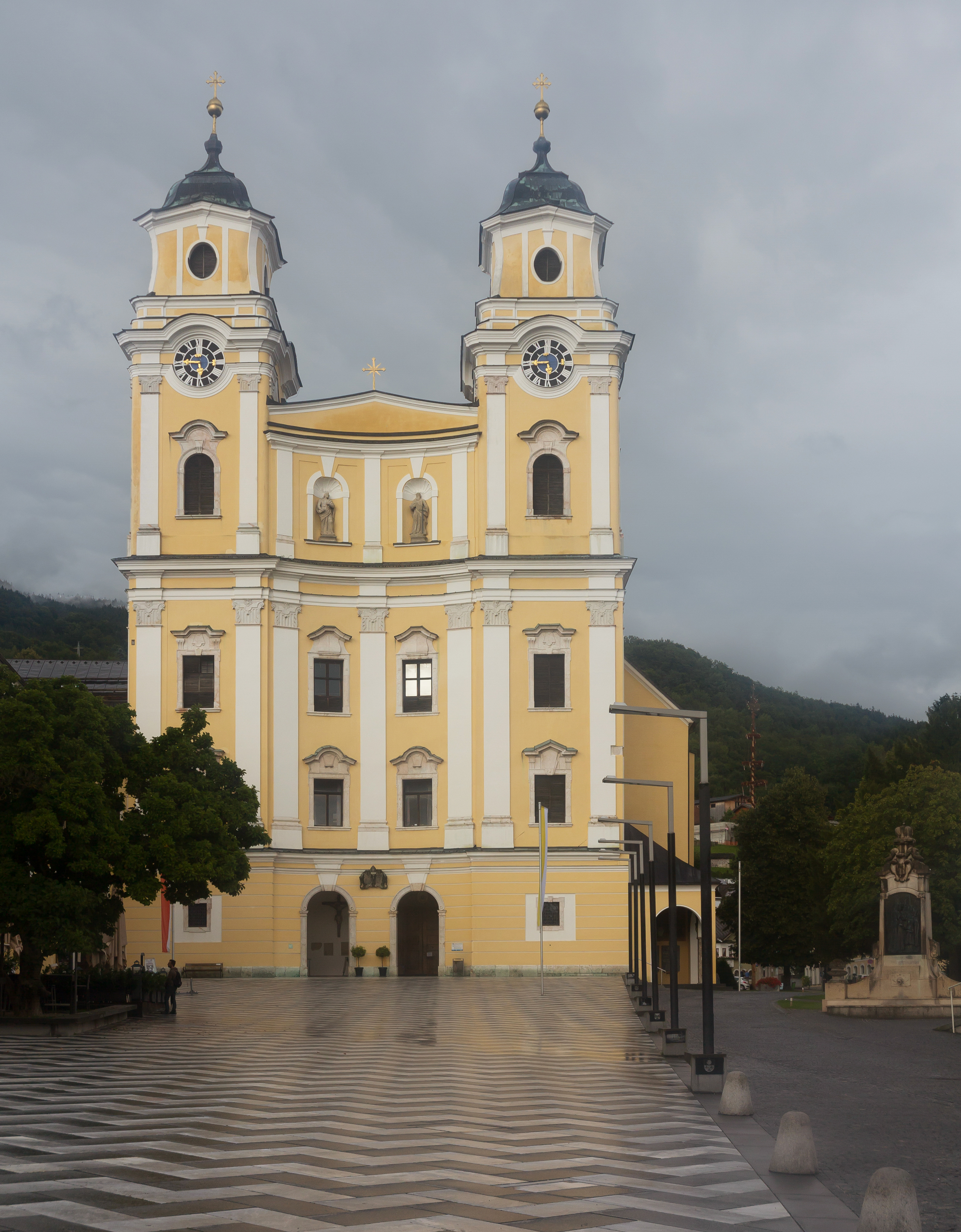
St Michael Basilica (formerly Collegiate Church) at Mondsee, site of the wedding scene in The Sound of Music

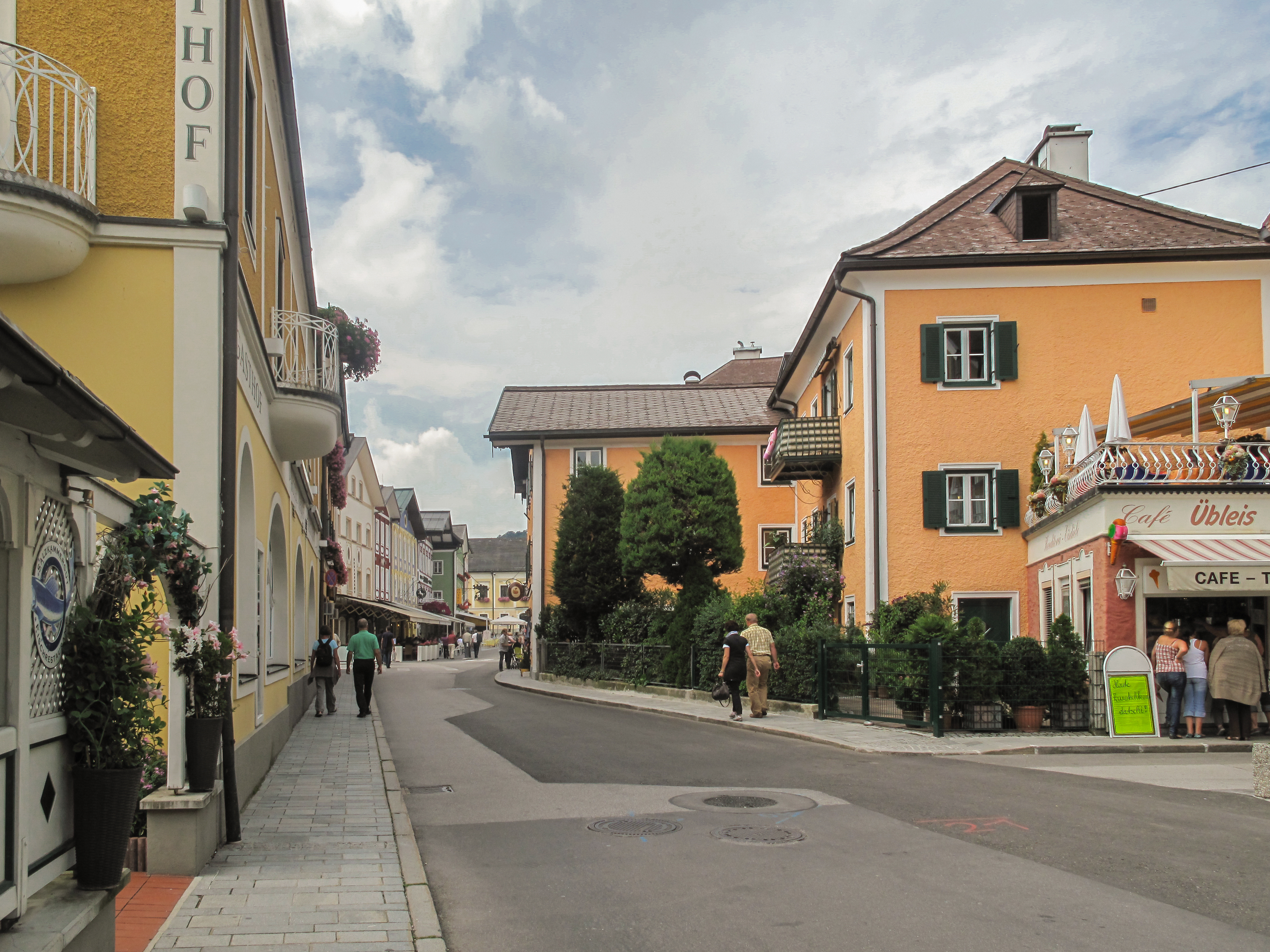
Street view

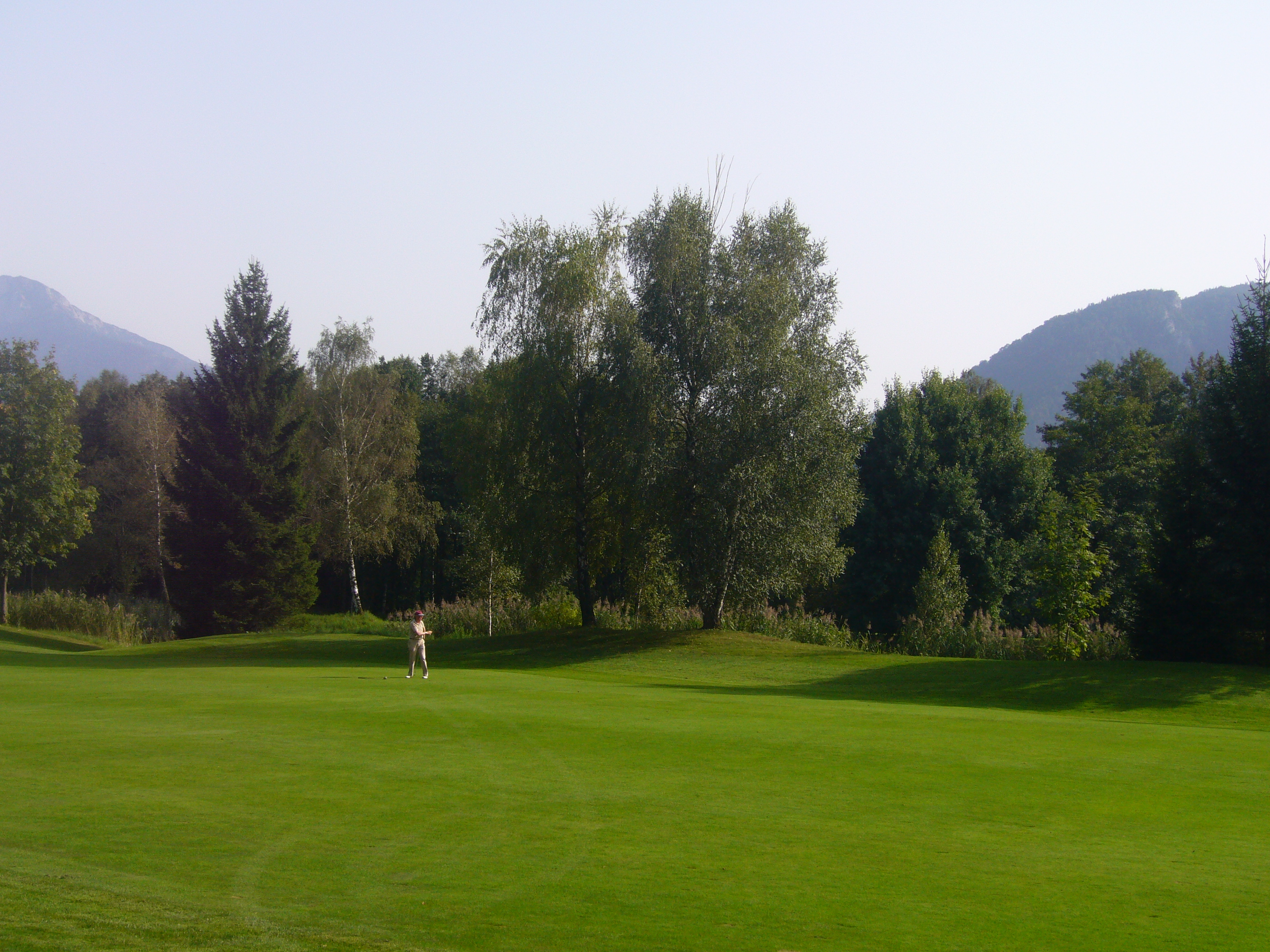
Mondsee Golf Club

== See also ==
- Mondseer cheese
