= Tilsit cheese =

East Prussian semi-hard cheese

Tilsit
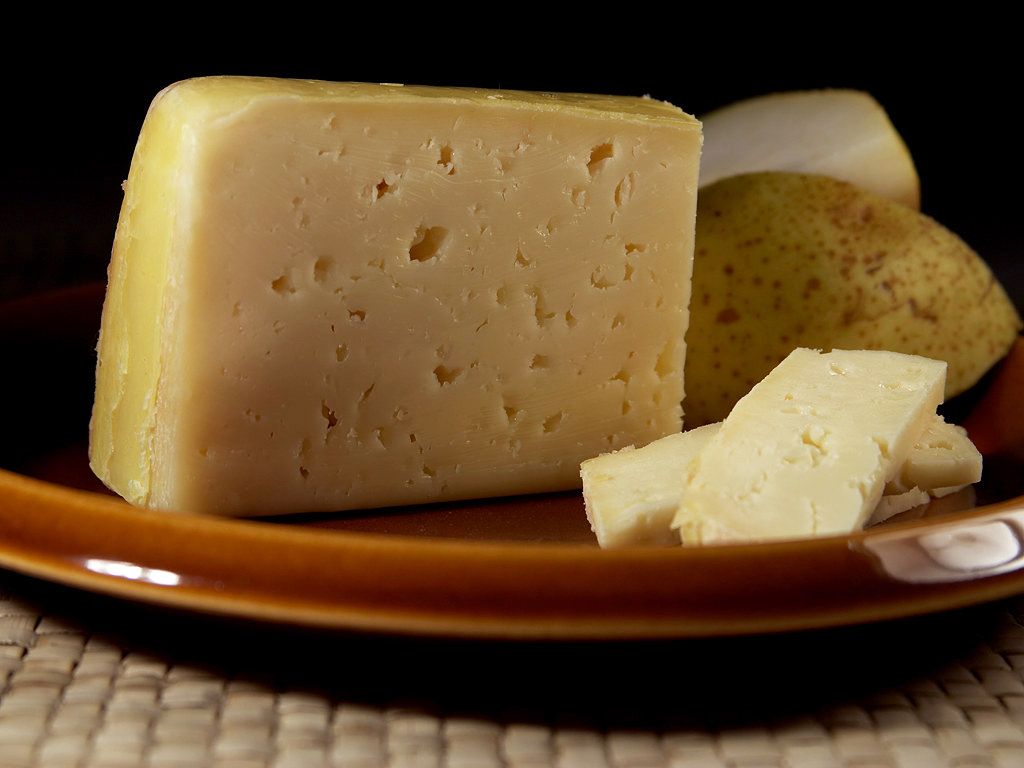
- Other names: Tilsit cheese, Tilsiter cheese
- Country of origin: Kingdom of Prussia/German Empire
- Region: East Prussia (today's Kaliningrad Oblast)
- Town: Tilsit (today's Sovetsk)
- Texture: semi-hard
- Certification: Holsteiner Tilsiter PGI (Dec. 2013)
- Named after: Sovetsk

Tilsit cheese or Tilsiter cheese is a pale yellow semihard smear-ripened cheese, created in the mid-19th century by Prussian-Swiss settlers, the Westphal family, from the Emmental valley. The original buildings from the cheese plant still exist in Sovetsk, Russia, formerly Tilsit, on the Neman River, in the former German province of East Prussia.

The same ingredients to make the cheese were not available as in their home country, and the cheese became colonized by different moulds, yeasts, and bacteria in the humid climate. The result was a cheese that was more intense and full-flavoured. The settlers named the cheese after Tilsit, the town where they had settled.

Tilsiter has a medium-firm texture with irregular holes or cracks. Commercially produced Tilsiter is made from pasteurized cow's milk, ranges from 30 to 60% milk fat, and has a dark yellow rind. After the main part of its production, the cheese needs to rest for an additional two months. Often flavoured with caraway seed and peppercorns, Tilsiter is a complement to hearty brown and rye breads and dark beers. It is a common table cheese, yet versatile. Tilsit can be eaten cubed in salads, melted in sauces, on potatoes, in flans, or on burgers.

Using the reimported recipe, Tilsiter has been manufactured in Switzerland since 1893 and in Germany since 1920, where it is known as the protected brand Holsteiner Tilsiter. Swiss Tilsiter is mainly produced in three varieties. A mild version (green label) is made from pasteurised milk, a more strongly flavoured one from fresh, unpasteurized milk (red label), and the yellow-labeled "Rahm-Tilsiter" is produced from pasteurized milk with added cream.

After World War II, when Tilsit and the rest of northern East Prussia became the Soviet Kaliningrad Oblast district, Tilsiter-style cheeses were produced in Switzerland and Germany.

Tilsit cheese is now also made in Austria, Finland, Estonia, Latvia, Lithuania, Poland, Romania, Russia, and Ukraine, and is marketed in the U.S.

== See also ==
- Culinary Heritage of Switzerland
- Havarti
- List of cheeses
