= Livarot cheese =

French cheese of the Normandy region

Livarot
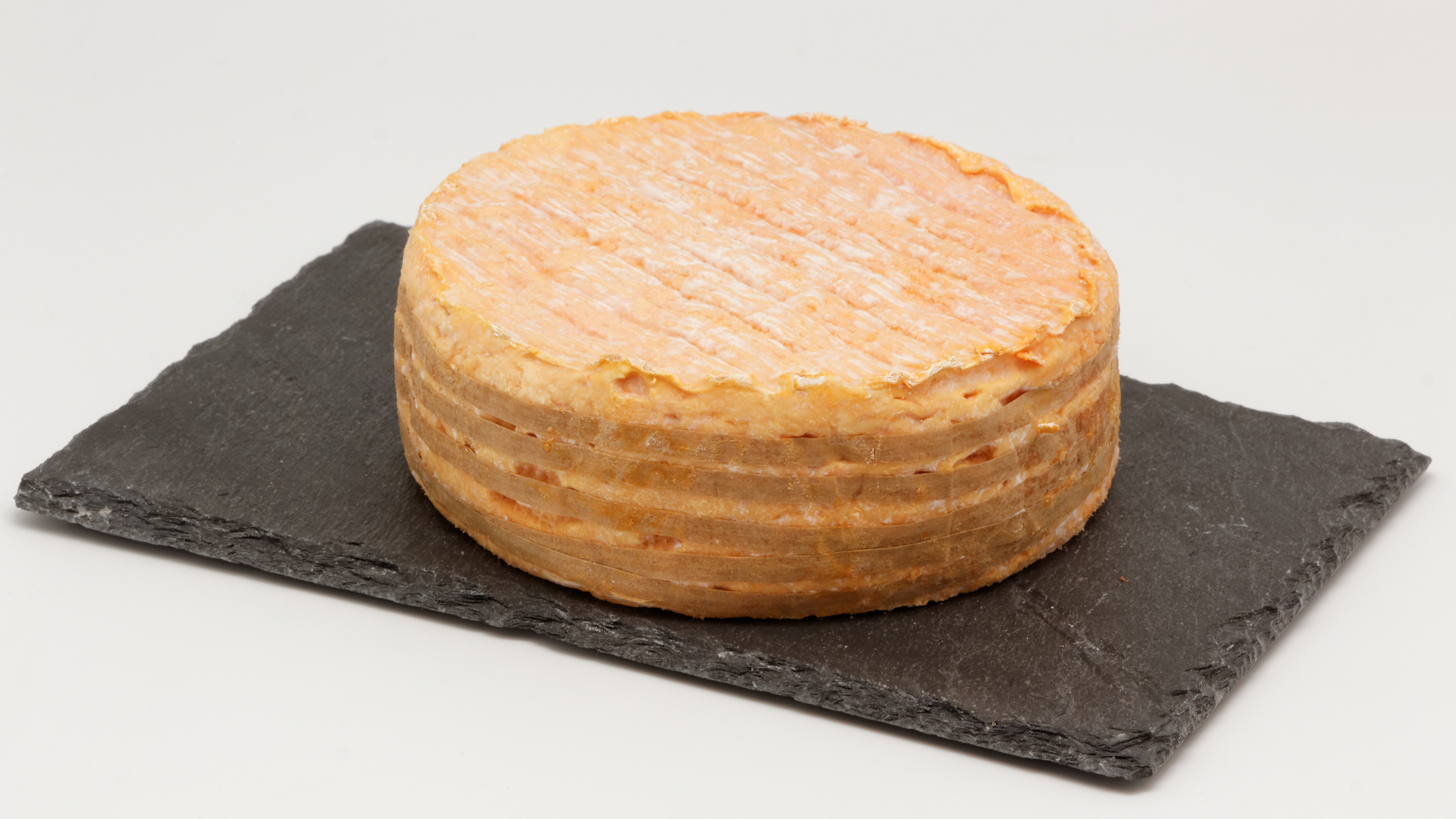
- Country of origin: France
- Region: Normandy, Livarot
- Source of milk: Cows
- Pasteurised: Depends on variety
- Texture: Soft washed-rind
- Aging time: 6–8 weeks
- Certification: AOC, 1975

Livarot (French pronunciation: [livaʁo]) is a French cheese of the Normandy region, originating in the commune of Livarot, and protected by an Appellation d'origine contrôlée (AOC) since 1975.

It is a soft, pungent, washed rind cheese made from Normande cow's milk. The normal weight for a round of Livarot is 450 grams (16 oz), though it also comes in other weights. It is sold in cylindrical form with the orangish rind wrapped in three to five rings of dried reedmace (Typha latifolia). For this reason, it has been referred to as "colonel", as the rings of dried bullrush resemble the stripes on a colonel's uniform. Sometimes green paper is also used. Its orange colour comes from different sources depending on the manufacturer, but is often annatto. The bacterium Brevibacterium linens is employed in fermentation. Production in 1998 was 1,101 tonnes, down 12.2% since 1996. Only 12% of Livarot are made from raw, unpasteurised milk. Its period of optimal tasting is spread out from May to September after a refining from six to eight weeks, but it is also excellent from March to December.

== See also ==
- List of cheeses
