= La Ferté-Gaucher =

- Commune
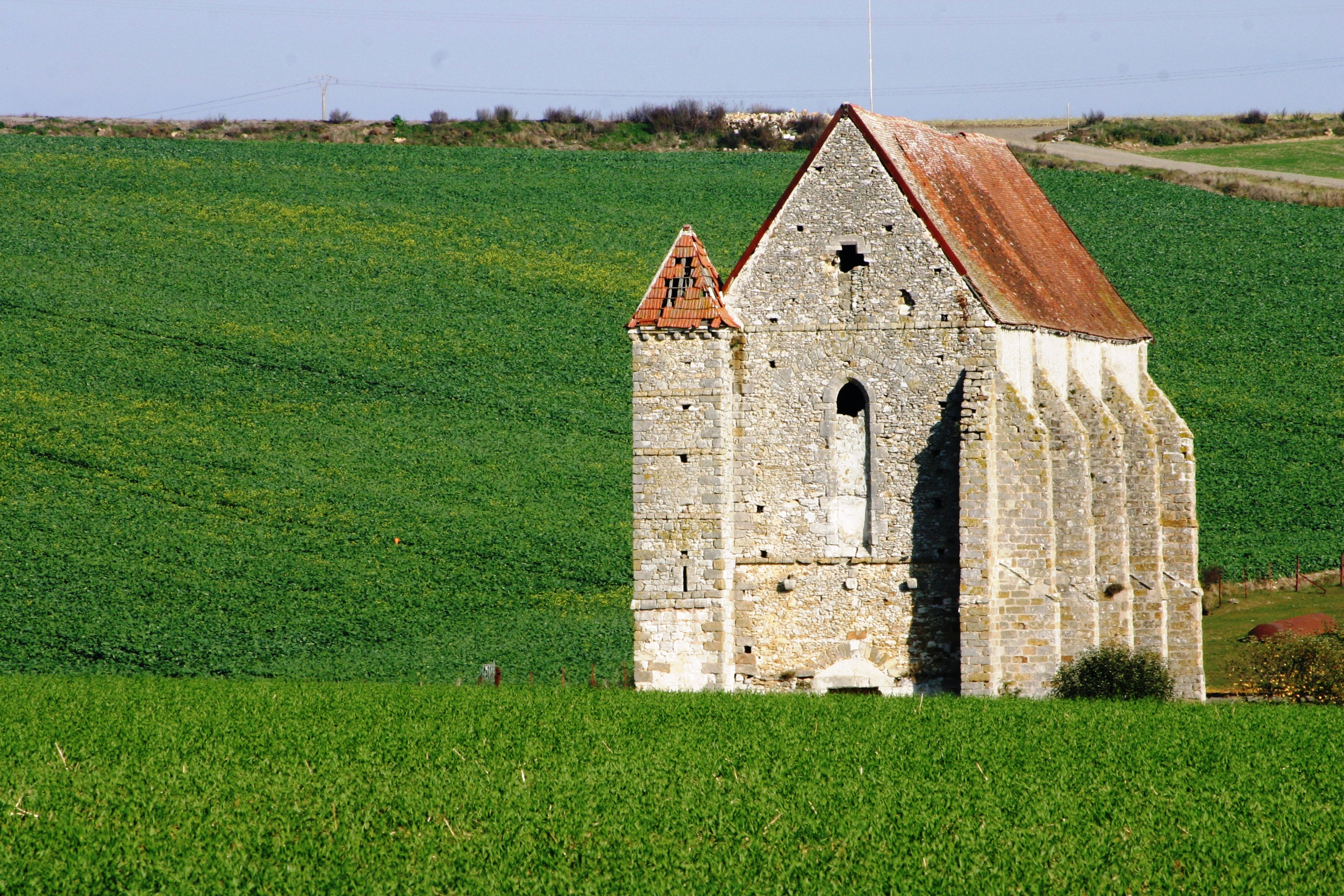
- Chapel of the Knights Templar

- Coat of arms
- Location of La Ferté-Gaucher
- Location within France Location within Île-de-France (region)
- Coordinates: 48°47′03″N 3°18′29″E
- Country: France
- Region: Île-de-France
- Department: Seine-et-Marne
- Arrondissement: Provins
- Canton: Coulommiers

Government
  - Mayor (2020–2026): Michel Jozon
- Area^{1}: 17.32 km^{2} (6.69 sq mi)
- Highest elevation: 188 m (617 ft)
- Lowest elevation: 107 m (351 ft)
- Population (2023): 4,743
  - Density: 273.8/km^{2} (709.3/sq mi)
- Time zone: UTC+01:00 (CET)
  - Summer (DST): UTC+02:00 (CEST)
- INSEE/Postal code: 77182 /77320
- ^{1} French Land Register data, which excludes lakes, ponds, glaciers > 1 km^{2} (0.386 sq mi or 247 acres) and river estuaries.

La Ferté-Gaucher (French pronunciation: [la fɛʁte ɡoʃe]) is a commune in the Seine-et-Marne department in the Île-de-France region in north-central France.

== Population ==
Historical population
Year	Pop.	±% p.a.
1968	3,258	—
1975	3,821	+2.30%
1982	3,871	+0.19%
1990	3,924	+0.17%
1999	4,150	+0.62%
2007	4,092	−0.18%
2012	4,691	+2.77%
2017	4,860	+0.71%
2023	4,743	−0.41%
Source: INSEE

Inhabitants of La Ferté-Gaucher are called Fertois in French.

== See also ==
- Communes of the Seine-et-Marne department
