= Washed-rind cheese =

Type of cheese treated with brine

Washed-rind or smear-ripened cheeses are cheeses which are periodically treated with brine or mold-bearing agents. This encourages the growth of certain bacteria on their surfaces which give them distinctive flavors. There are hard and soft washed-rind cheeses. The softer ones are sometimes distinguished as "smear-ripened". Conversely, the term "washed-rind" is sometimes reserved only for the hard ones.

== Production ==
Washed-rind cheeses are periodically cured in a solution of saltwater brine or mold-bearing agents that may include beer, wine, brandy and spices, making their surfaces amenable to a class of bacteria (Brevibacterium linens, the reddish-orange smear bacteria) that impart pungent odors and distinctive flavors and produce a firm, flavorful rind around the cheese. Washed-rind cheeses can be soft (Limburger), semi-hard, or hard (Appenzeller). The same bacteria can also have some effect on cheeses that are simply ripened in humid conditions, like Camembert. The process requires regular washings, particularly in the early stages of production, making it quite labor-intensive compared to other methods of cheese production.

== Examples ==
=== Soft (smear-ripened) ===
- Ardrahan
- Brick cheese
- Époisses
- Fontina
- Herve (Limburger)
- Langres
- Maroilles
- Mondseer
- Munster
- Pont-l'Évêque
- Saint-Nectaire
- Taleggio
- Tilsit

=== Hard (washed-rind) ===
- Appenzeller
- Beaufort
- Gruyère
- Oka cheese

== See also ==
- Types of cheese

== Bibliography ==
- Gremmels, David (2017). "washed-rind cheeses". The Oxford Companion to Cheese. Oxford University Press. ISBN 9780199330911.
