= La Ferté-Frênel =

- Part of La Ferté-en-Ouche
- Location of La Ferté-Frênel
- Location within France Location within Normandy
- Coordinates: 48°50′32″N 0°30′42″E
- Country: France
- Region: Normandy
- Department: Orne
- Arrondissement: Mortagne-au-Perche
- Canton: Rai
- Commune: La Ferté-en-Ouche
- Area^{1}: 7.70 km^{2} (2.97 sq mi)
- Elevation: 260 m (850 ft)
- Highest elevation: 286 m (938 ft)
- Lowest elevation: 246 m (807 ft)
- Population (2022): 587
  - Density: 76.2/km^{2} (197/sq mi)
- Time zone: UTC+01:00 (CET)
  - Summer (DST): UTC+02:00 (CEST)
- Postal code: 61550
- ^{1} French Land Register data, which excludes lakes, ponds, glaciers > 1 km^{2} (0.386 sq mi or 247 acres) and river estuaries.

La Ferté-Frênel (French pronunciation: [la fɛʁte fʁɛnɛl]) is a former commune in the Orne department in north-western France. On 1 January 2016, it was merged into the new commune of La Ferté-en-Ouche.

== Heraldry ==
Arms of La Ferté-Frênel	The arms of La Ferté-Frênel are blazoned : Quarterly Or and sable, an eagle and a lion gules, all within a bordure embattled vert.

== See also ==
- Communes of the Orne department
