= Seewalchen am Attersee =

- Municipality
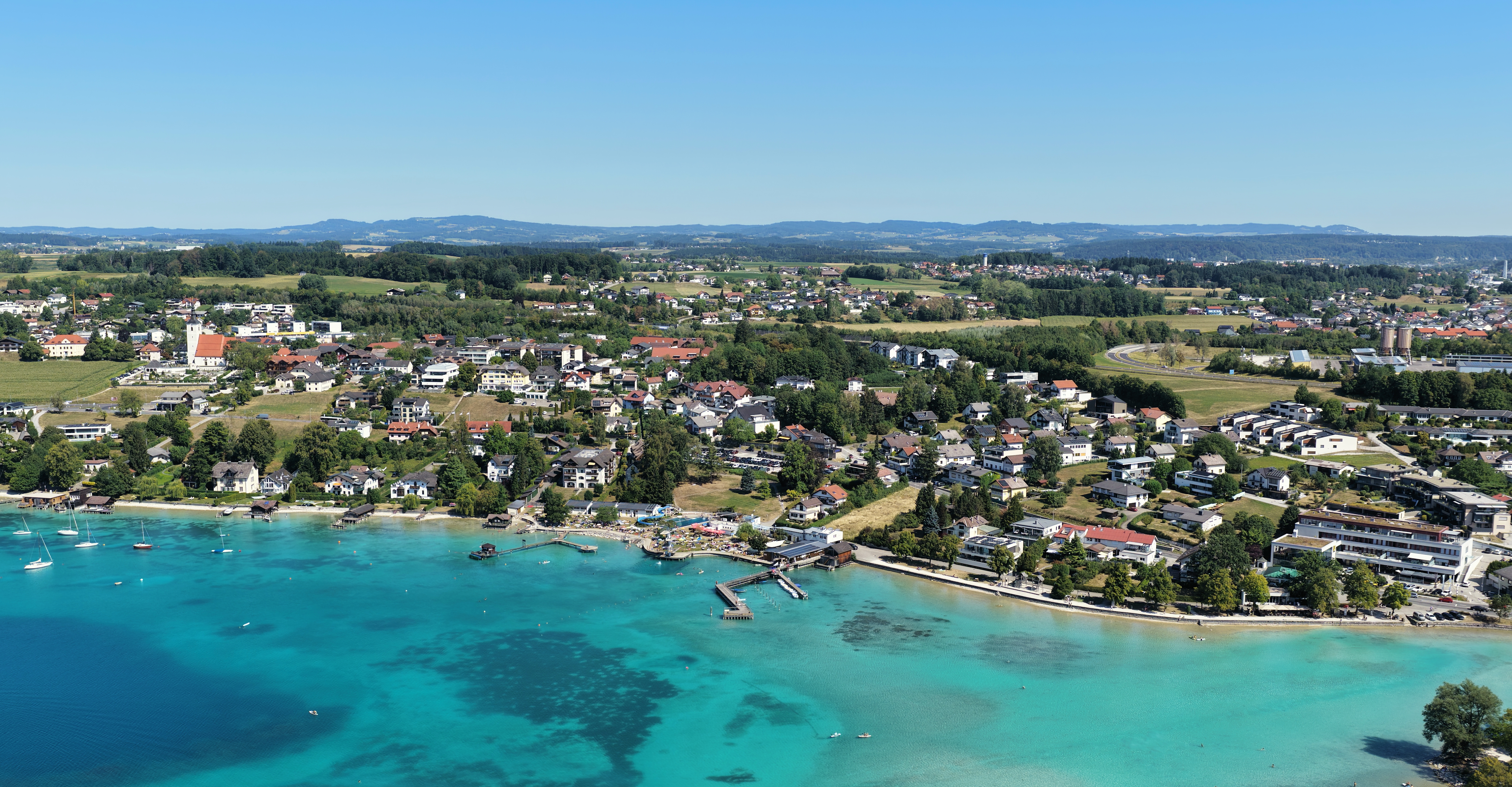
- South view of Seewalchen am Attersee

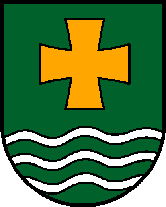
- Coat of arms

- Location within Austria
- Coordinates: 47°57′01″N 13°35′01″E
- Country: Austria, EU
- State: Upper Austria
- District: Vöcklabruck

Government
  - Mayor: Gerald Egger (ÖVP)

Area
  - Total: 23.74 km^{2} (9.17 sq mi)
- Elevation: 498 m (1,634 ft)

Population (2026)
  - Total: 5,725
  - Density: 241.2/km^{2} (624.6/sq mi)
- Time zone: UTC+1 (CET)
  - Summer (DST): UTC+2 (CEST)
- Postal code: 4863
- Area code: 07662
- Vehicle registration: VB
- Website: www.seewalchen.eu

Seewalchen am Attersee (until Junary 1, 1962 only Seewalchen) is a market town in Upper Austria in the district of Vöcklabruck in the Hausruckviertel with 5725 inhabitants (as of January 1, 2026). The responsible judicial district is Vöcklabruck.

== Geography ==
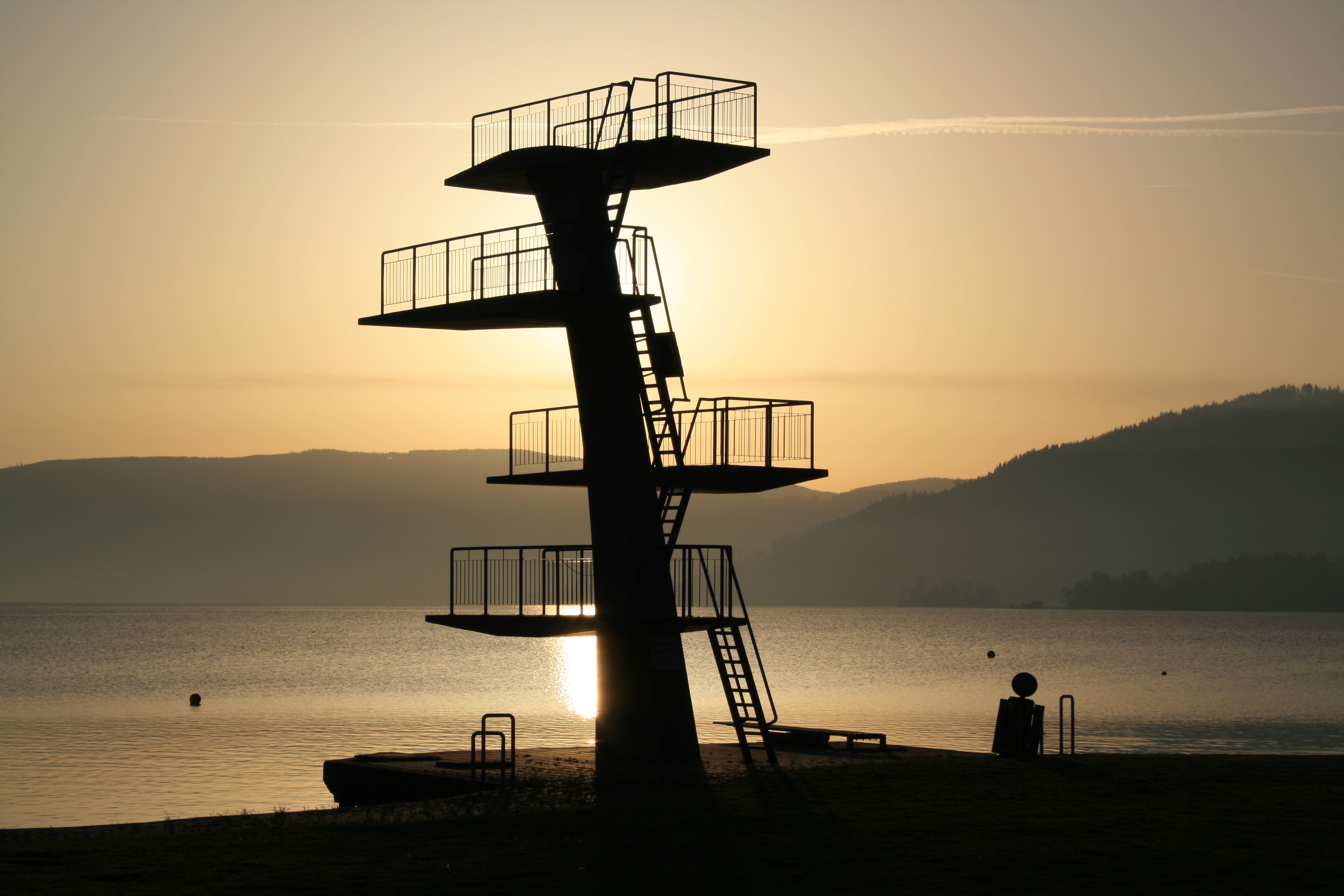
The diving tower, the unofficial landmark of the municipality

Seewalchen am Attersee lies at an altitude of 498 m above sea level along the Attersee lake and the Ager river. It stretches 6.3 km from north to south and 6.6 km from west to east. The totel area covers 23.9 km². 12.1% of the area is forested, 58,2% of the area is used for agriculture.

=== Municipal division ===
The municipal area comprises the following settlements (in brackets: number of inhabitants as of January 1, 2026)

- Ainwalchen (79)
- Buchberg (111)
- Gerlham (145)
- Haidach (118)
- Haining (139)
- Kemating (158)
- Kraims (250)
- Litzlberg (311)
- Moos (31)
- Neißing (64)
- Neubrunn (124)
- Pettighofen (55)
- Reichersberg (93)
- Roitham (49)
- Rosenau (1000)
- Seewalchen am Attersee (3000)
- Staudach (34)
- Steindorf (953)
- Unterbuchberg (11)

=== Neighboring municipalities ===
- Timelkam (north)
- Berg im Attergau (south)
- Schörfling am Attersee (east)
- Gampern (west)
- Lenzing an der Ager (north-east)

== History ==
=== Early history and lake dwellings ===
The first lake dwellings on Lake Attersee were built between 4,000 and 3,500 BC. Recent finds in the area around the Seewalchen diving tower indicate that they are around 7,000 years old. People lived in lake dwellings all along the lake shore, including in Seewalchen, Litzlberg and Unterbuchberg. Finds at Lake Attersee date back to the Neolithic and Bronze Ages.

Research into lake dwellings began in Upper Austria on 25 August 1870, when Count Wurmbrand of Gundach excavated the first lake dwelling finds in Seewalchen, these also sparked a genuine lake dwelling craze in Austria.

Many finds were unearthed at Lake Attersee by the sand dredger Theodor Wang whilst dredging for sand, he was able to more than double his income in part through the sale of these finds. Wang was born on 15 October 1870 in Vienna as Theodor Krobatschek and, like his siblings, was adopted on 27 October 1909 by the landowner Nikolaus Wang, who ran a steam-powered sawmill in Seewalchen. He is regarded as the discoverer of several lake dwelling sites on Lake Attersee, including Misling 1, Misling 2 and Litzlberg. He sold the finds to the furniture manufacturer and owner of the Schneckenvilla in Seewalchen, the Natural History Museum Vienna and, after the First World War, also to the local history museum in Vöcklabruck.

His role, and that of other sand fishermen who acted as artefact hunters, is highly controversial due to the ‘brutal’ nature of the artefact recovery. They are therefore often referred to as looters. It is undisputed, however, that the recovery methods were standard practice at the time and that, without them, research would not have been possible for a long time.

Today, many lake dwellings submerged in the water are at risk from construction work and shipping.

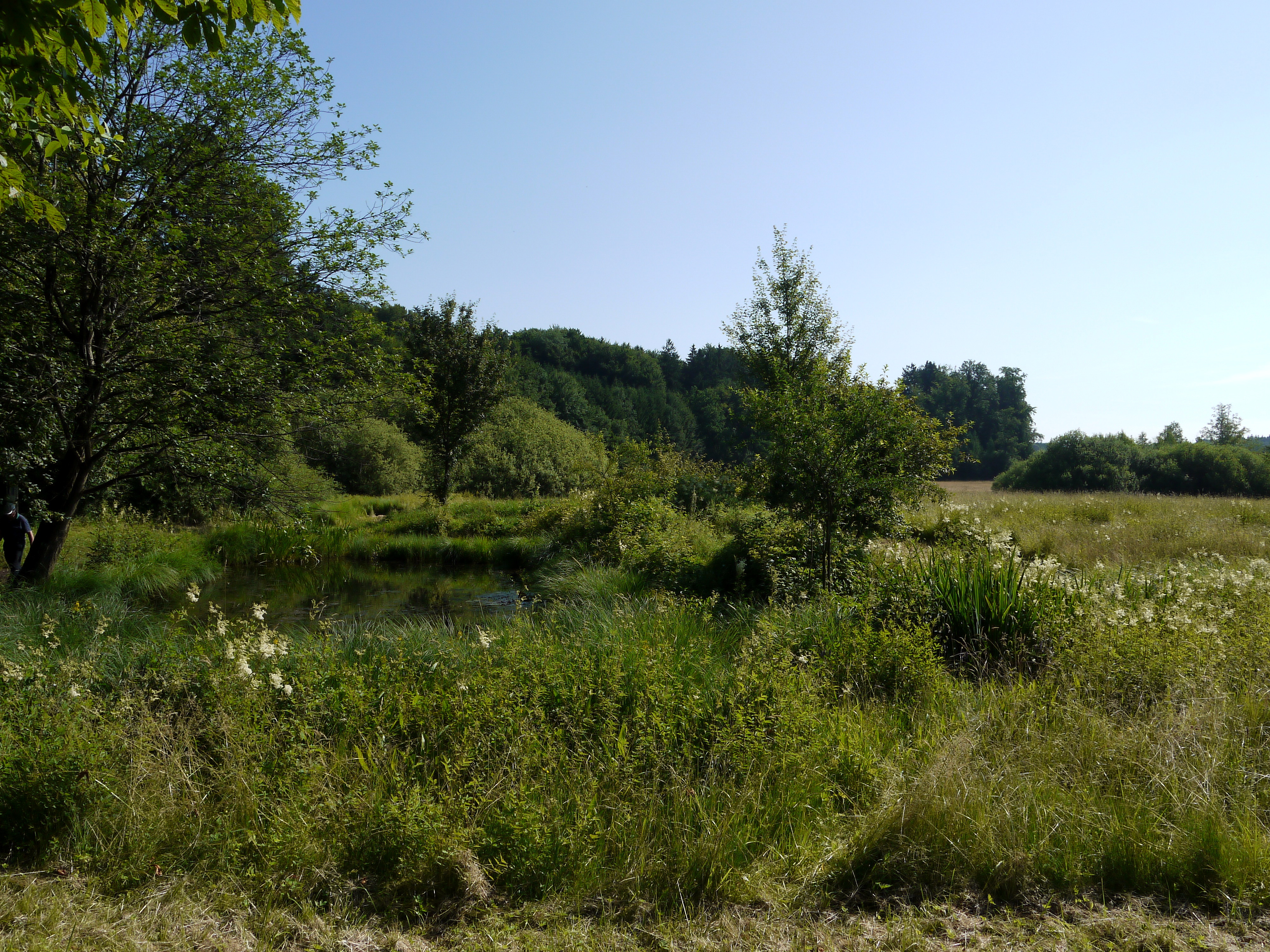
Gerlhamer moor in Seewalchen

The wetland settlement (as scientists refer to lake dwellings) in the Gerlhamer Moor occupies a special place, as it is unique in Austria. This nature reserve, situated in the south-west of the municipal area, is a listed site. Important finds from the moor include a bronze belt hook (Natural History Museum) and a long bronze dagger blade (Max Schmidt Collection), which were discovered in 1904 whilst cutting peat. The peat cutting site was then owned by master brewer Paul Ellinger from Litzlberg.

On 27 June 2011, UNESCO declared 111 lake dwellings around the Alps a World Heritage Site. Seewalchen is represented by the Litzlberg Süd lake dwelling site, one of three World Heritage sites on Lake Attersee and five in Austria. In 2026/27, the Provincial Culture EXPO will take place on this theme.

In 2005, a Celtic burial mound from the Latène period (5th century BC) containing interesting grave goods was excavated in the woods between Seewalchen and Berg.

=== Roman age ===
Around 15 BC, Seewalchen was part of the Roman province of Noricum. The claim, made in older writings, that the important transport route from Wels to Salzburg ran along the Attersee is probably not historically tenable, and the view that Seewalchen lies on the site of the Roman settlement of Laciacis is likewise not scientifically proven, though it is widely held in the literature on Seewalchen. Several finds do, however, point to Roman settlement, a Roman inscription was found at Litzlberg Castle in 1916. A fragment of a Roman gravestone is embedded in the north side (outer wall) of the parish church. The hoard discovered in 1950 during levelling work on the lakeshore was exceptionally valuable: 100 silver dinars, several rings and bracelets, probably dating from the year 200 AD. These valuable finds are now on display at the Vöcklabruck local history museum.

=== Middle ages ===
Most of the place names in the municipality of Seewalchen originate from the Baiuvariis who settled in the area between 500 and 550, following the Roman withdrawal in 488. The Baiuvarii followed the Roman roads and encountered Romanised locals. They called the settlements of the remaining population walchen, as place names such as Seewalchen or Ainwalchen indicate. This is also how the name of the municipality came about: the place where the Walchen lived by the See (lake in Austrian).

The Old High German phase spans from around 500 to 1100. Place names ending in -ing (slightly older) and -heim (slightly younger) indicate this. However, there are also false -ing names. The genuine -ing names originate from settlements established between 600 and 800. During the expansion phase between 800 and 1000, -heim names were particularly common.

During the period of Christianisation, the following place names were first mentioned: Steindorf in 750, Ainwalchen in 807 and Kemating in 822.

The Middle High German phase began around the year 1000. The second phase of settlement expansion is characterised by names ending in -dorf, -berg and -bach. The third phase of settlement expansion is characterised by names ending in -reit, -schlag and -eck. However, the extensive clearing of land led to a drop in the water table. Names ending in -reit and -öd correspond with one another.

The Christianisation of the area began from Salzburg before the turn of the millennium. The Church of St James in Seewalchen is thought to have already existed as the original parish. In the Middle Ages, the connection to the Salzburg Michaelbeuern Abbey had a lasting impact. Seewalchen was first mentioned in a document there in 1135. The present-day church was built between 1439 and 1476.

The Catholic parish church of Seewalchen dates back to the time of Charlemagne. From the fact that the church is dedicated to St James the Greater, researchers conclude that a church already existed in Roman times. In the Middle Ages, the surrounding areas were incorporated into the ecclesiastical structure with Seewalchen as the centre. Seewalchen was thus a typical clearing parish, whose parish boundaries encompassed the entire Attersee region up to the watershed with Lake Traunsee.

A large part of the present-day parish territory came into the possession of the monasteries of Kremsmünster, Mondsee and Michaelbeuern through donations. From 1135, when the church was incorporated into the Benedictine abbey and the name Seewalchen first appeared in a document, Seewalchen was closely linked to the monastery for 748 years. This close connection to Michaelbeuern Abbey only came to an end in 1983 when the parish was taken over by the Diocese of Linz.

=== Modern era ===
Since 1490 Seewalchen has been part of the Principality Österreich ob der Enns. With Emperor Joseph II's patent of 1785 on tax and land regulation, Seewalchen became a tax or Cadastral municipality. During the Napoleonic Wars the town was occupied several times by french troops. Since 1918, the municipality has been a part of the new formed State of Upper Austria.

On May 9, 1977 the municipality was given the market town right.

== Economy and infrastructure ==
=== Transport ===
The single-track, electrified Kammerer railway runs through the municipality. Coming from Vöcklabruck, it branches off from the Western Railway in Timelkam and leads to Kammer-Schörfling at Lake Attersee. The station Siebenmühlen-Rosenau is served by Austrian Federal Railways (ÖBB) every hour from Monday to Friday, and every two hours at weekends. The trains used for this, mostly Talent and Desiro ML, and occasionally also CityShuttle with class 1044/1144, are sometimes continued to Attnang-Puchheim.

Coming from Lenzing, the Attersee road B151 leads through the municipality to Berg im Attergau.

The West Autobahn (A1) runs through the municipality, traversing multiple bridge structures build. Seewalchen has one of the single longest highway on- and off-ramps in Austria and the EU with a length of more than 2.2 kilometres.

=== Public institutions ===
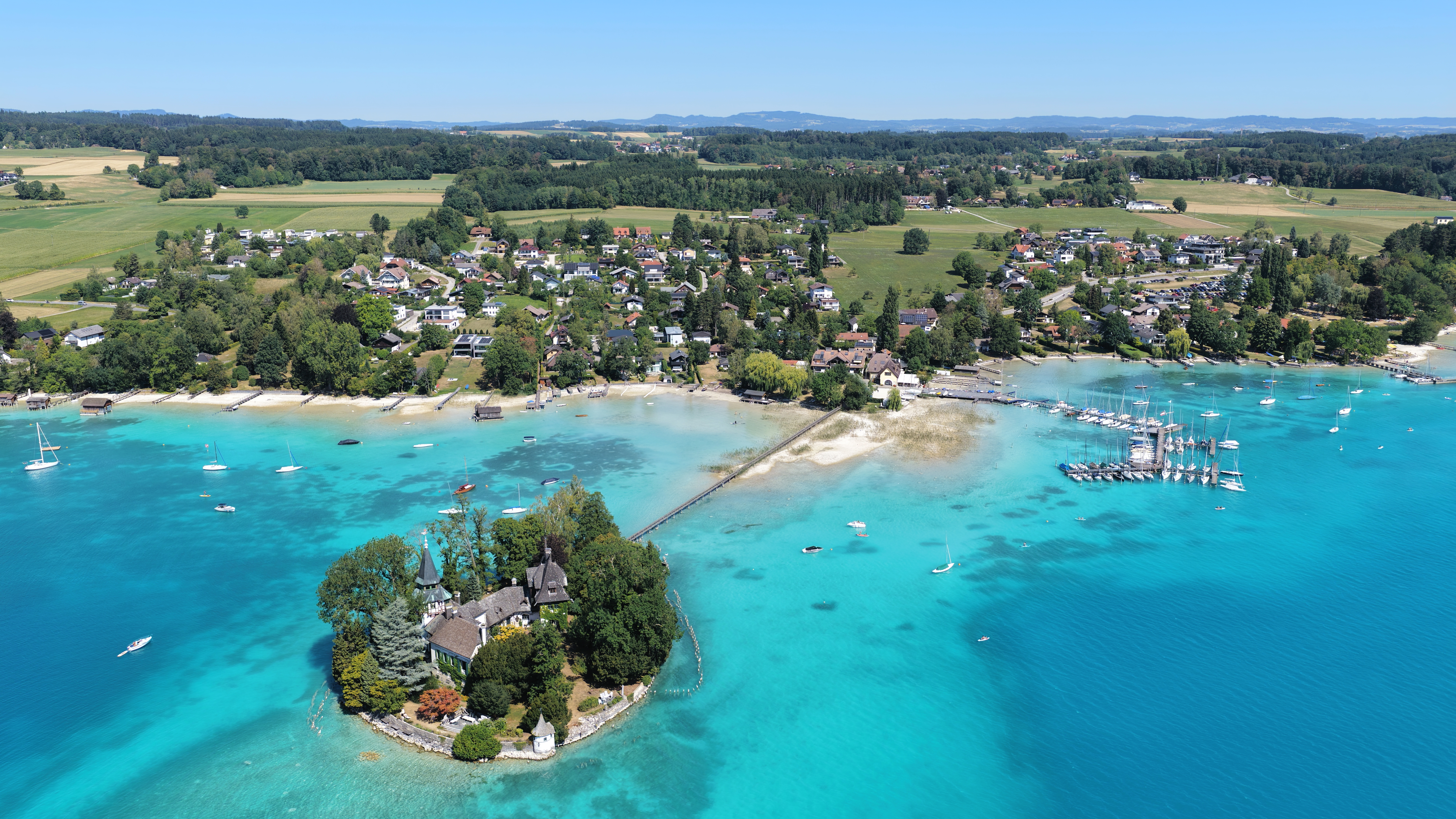
Litzlberg with castle

- Seewalchen Lido
- Litzlberg lakeside resort
- 28 public green spaces
- Crèche
- Parish kindergarten
- Preschool
- Primary school (VS)
- Secondary school (NMS)
- State Music School
- 6 public playgrounds
- 3 volunteer fire department (Seewalchen, Kemating and Steindorf)
- Red Cross department
- Litzlberg Water Rescue Service
- Civic amenity site

== Politics ==
With the municipal council and mayoral elections in Upper Austria 2021, the municipal council has the following distribution:

- 13 Austrian People's Party (ÖVP)
- 7 Social Democratic Party of Austria (SPÖ)
- 5 Freedom Party of Austria (FPÖ).
- 6 Greens

In prior elections it was:

- 2015: 13 ÖVP, 7 FPÖ, 7 SPÖ and 4 Greens
- 2009: 14 ÖVP, 10 SPÖ, 5 FPÖ and 2 Greens
- 2003: 13 ÖVP, 12 SPÖ, 3 FPÖ and 3 Greens

=== Mayors ===
Mayors since 1850 have been:

- 1850–1855 Anton Peyr
- 1855–1858 Franz Holzinger
- 1858–1861 Anton Hofmann
- 1861–1870 Josef Reibersdorfer
- 1870–1876 Josef Leitner
- 1876–1879 Matthias Holzinger
- 1879–1879 Wolfgang Starzinger
- 1879–1882 Bernhard Aigner
- 1882–1885 Anton Stallinger
- 1885–1888 Franz Stigler
- 1888–1891 Michael Eicher
- 1891–1894 Josef Moser
- 1894–1897 Josef Wenninger
- 1897–1900 Georg Sulzberger
- 1900–1903 Carl Leiß
- 1903–1906 Matthias Lechner
- 1906–1906 Matthias Gaubinger
- 1906–1907 Josef Gunst
- 1907–1909 Carl Häupl
- 1909–1912 Franz Hemetsberger
- 1912–1919 Franz Stallinger
- 1919–1924 Karl Waliser
- 1924–1929 Matthias Krempler
- 1929–1934 Johann Mayr
- 1934–1934 Josef Frickh
- 1934–1938 Johann Dachs
  (removed from office)
- 1938–1938 Georg Meinhart
- 1938–1945 Josef Häupl
  (removed from office)
- 1945–1946 Johann Dachs
- 1946–1949 Josef Frickh
  & Alois Hemetsberger
- 1949–1955 Martin Wehinger (ÖVP)
- 1954–1962 Josef Gebetsberger (ÖVP)
- 1962–1967 Franz Moser (ÖVP)
- 1967–1984 Alois Ulm (SPÖ)
- 1984–1997 Josef Limberger (SPÖ)
- 1997–2019 Johann Reiter (ÖVP)
- since 2020 Gerald Egger (ÖVP)

=== Coat of arms ===
The waves symbolise the location and, consequently, the municipality’s additional name. The curved cross, derived from the crux quadrata, is intended to refer to the early Christianisation of the area and, like the waves, is taken from the seal of Maurus Riha, Abbot of Michaelbeuern. It was designed by Gerhard Johann Zopf.

=== Twin towns ===
The market town of Seewalchen am Attersee maintains a municipal partnership with the bavarian municipality of Freyung in Germany.

== Notable people ==
=== Honorary citizen ===
- Franz Karl Ginzkey (1950)
- Josef Limberger
- Johann Reiter (2022)

=== Sons and daughters of the municipality ===
- Theodor Wang (1870–1947), sand fisherman and pioneer of lake dwellings
- Karl Häupl (1893–1960), dentist and university lecturer, honorary citizen of Seewalchen
- Elisabeth Maria Maurer (1914), writer
- Maximilian Zweimüller (1932–2008), teacher, headteacher, choir director, harpsichordist and organist
- Rudolf Hinterdorfer (1947), composer
- Gerhard Müller (1950), painter, graphic designer, art teacher and university lecturer
- Martin Fischer (1955), composer and journalist
- Markus Bless (1963), music and media artists
- Marcel Ziegl (1992), footballer

=== People associated with the municipality ===
- Julius Arigi (1895-1981), famous fighter pilot of the First World War who settled in Seewalchen after being expelled from the Sudetenland.
- Claudia Hauschildt-Buschberger (1970), politician
- Lisa-Maria Kellermayr, doctor
