= Lisa-Maria Kellermayr =

Austrian doctor (1985–2022)

Lisa-Maria Kellermayr was an Austrian doctor. She became known to a broad public when she was massively threatened by opponents of vaccination and critics of the coronavirus protection measures during the COVID-19 pandemic. She then closed her doctor's office and committed suicide a month later.

The authorities, especially the Austrian police, have repeatedly been accused of serious failure.

== Life ==
Kellermayr completed training as a paramedic. She then studied medicine in Graz and Vienna. She then worked in a rehabilitation clinic in Bad Ischl. From March 2020 on, she worked in the general practitioner emergency service and worked for months in the fight against the corona pandemic.

She found that glucocorticoid budesonide prevented severe COVID-19 progression and hospitalization. She shared this knowledge at the end of October 2020 at an online district doctor training course. This was hardly known in public.

=== Threats by opponents of Covid measures ===
For months, Kellermayr was threatened by those close to the Corona virus and those opposed to vaccination. The threats against her began when she criticized a demonstration by opponents of Covid measures in front of the clinic in Wels on 16 November 2021 on Twitter. The police in Upper Austria called Kellermayr's tweet a "false report" and accused her of "pushing herself into the public to promote her advancement".

Kellermayr deleted her tweet and asked the police to delete their tweet as well. She wrote on Twitter: "This tweet is the basis for a torrent of abuse, slander, threats, and best efforts by supporters of the scene to cause me maximum harm. It's used as a reason to call me a liar, a witch.” The police did not respond or delete their tweet, even months later, when the case had already garnered widespread media attention. Kellermayr became known in circles of radical opponents of vaccination through the police tweet and was the target of death threats, intimidation, and severe abuse.

She received several threats from a person who called himself “Claas the Killer.” He threatened to "slaughter" Kellermayr, to "narcotize and torture her in a basement." Kellermayr asked for police protection, but her request was denied. In order to protect herself and her employees, Kellermayr said she then spent 100,000 euros on security measures and private security personnel. Security personnel repeatedly took butterfly knives from patients waiting to be seen by Dr. Kellermayr in her practice.

On 6 April 2022, a complaint was filed against unknown persons at the Wels public prosecutor's office for dangerous threats against Kellermayr. Traces of a possible perpetrator led to Germany. On 14 June 2022, the Austrian judiciary dropped investigations because the potential perpetrator could not be convicted in Austria anyway. In an interview with Austria's public broadcaster, David Furtner, a spokesman for the Upper Austrian police, said that Kellermayr was pushing herself into the public and advised her to seek psychological help.

At the end of June 2022, Kellermayr closed her practice. The Federal Office for the Protection of the Constitution and Counterterrorism then began to deal with the case for the first time. German hacktivist Ornella Al-Lami provided information about “Claas the Killer”. It was "not much effort" to identify the person, the police "apparently did nothing about it," Al-Lami later told the newspaper Die Presse. The Upper Austrian police rejected the allegations, and the Directorate for State Security and Intelligence said they were taking the hacker's research results seriously.

=== Death ===
On 28 July 2022, Kellermayr spoke to the newspaper Der Standard. On 29 July 2022, Kellermayr was found dead in her doctor's office in Seewalchen am Attersee. The authorities ruled her death a suicide.

== Reactions ==
=== Austrian Authorities and politics ===
No further investigations by Austrian authorities are known. Police spokesman David Furtner took legal action with his lawyer and made a cease-and-desist declaration against a Twitter user who had criticised his statements.

Chancellor Karl Nehammer (ÖVP) did not comment on the case. SPÖ-head Pamela Rendi-Wagner and mayor of Vienna Michael Ludwig (SPÖ) expressed their concern. NEOS announced that they would launch a parliamentary inquiry into police conduct.

In a chapter of the "Encyclopedia of Heroism Studies" book, the case of Dr. Kellermayr was mentioned as a tragic example in the context of the dark side of COVID-19 pandemic heroism.

=== German Authorities and politics ===
The spokeswoman for the Munich II public prosecutor's office, the authority responsible for the area around the Bavarian capital Munich, confirmed four days after Kellermayr's death "investigations against a male person on suspicion of insult and threat."

German Health Minister Karl Lauterbach (SPD), who has himself faced massive threats since the start of the COVID-19 pandemic, wrote on Twitter: "She saved the lives of others and lost her's in return. Your work is carried on by others. The state must protect people like them.” SPD party leader Saskia Esken called on people to support victims of psychological violence.

The German Center for Monitoring, Analysis and Strategy (CeMAS) said that the strategy of consistently attacking people is used very specifically by the lateral thinking milieu and unfortunately shows the desired effect in many cases. Many of those who have been attacked withdraw or no longer express certain things, since the risk situation can be difficult to assess, especially for individuals, and can be very threatening. There is a mixture of people who act in a targeted manner, who constantly threaten those who think differently, and people who let their hatred run free, but act less strategically.
