= Lenzing =

Lenzing an der Ager
- Municipality
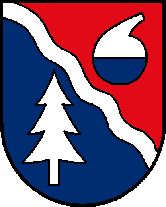
- Coat of arms

- Location within Austria
- Coordinates: 47°58′34″N 13°35′44″E
- Country: Austria, EU
- State: Upper Austria
- District: Vöcklabruck
- Oberachmann: 1785

Government
  - Mayor: Rudolf Vogtenhuber (SPÖ)

Area
  - Total: 8.89 km^{2} (3.43 sq mi)
- Elevation: 485 m (1,591 ft)

Population (2026)
  - Total: 5,306
  - Density: 597/km^{2} (1,550/sq mi)
- Time zone: UTC+1 (CET)
  - Summer (DST): UTC+2 (CEST)
- Postal code: 4860
- Area code: 07672
- Vehicle registration: VB
- Website: www.lenzing.ooe.gv.at

Lenzing an der Ager is a small market town in Upper Austria in the district of Vöcklabruck in the Hausruckviertel with 5306 inhabitants (as of January 1, 2026). The responsible judicial district is Vöcklabruck.

== Geography ==
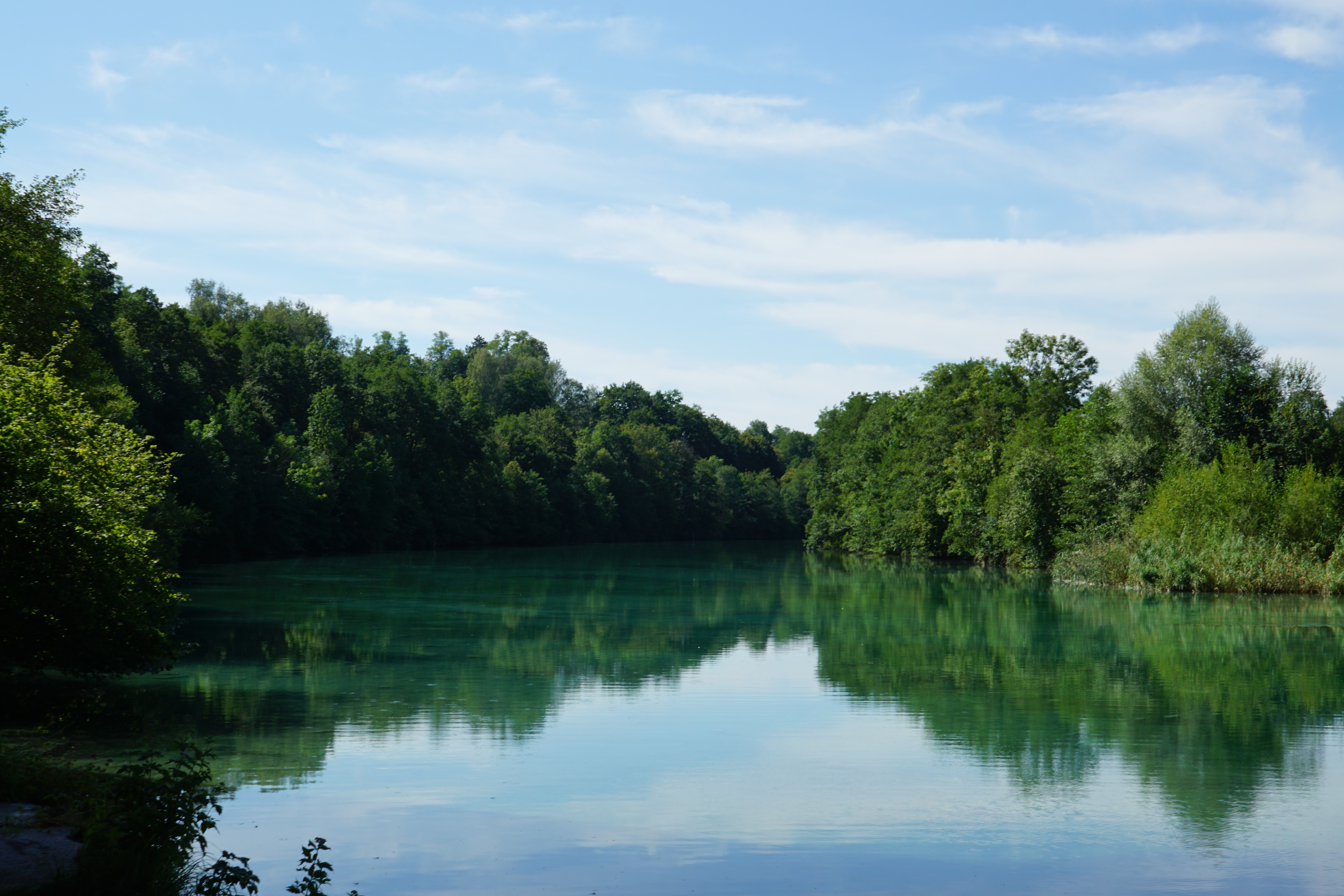
Ager from Lenzing shortly after the outflow from the Attersee

Lenzing lies at an altitude of 485 m above sea level along the Ager, just after its source from the Attersee. It stretches 4.1 km from north to south and 4.2 km from west to east. The total area covers 8.89 km². 13% of the area is forested, 51% of the area is used for agriculture.

=== Municipal division ===
The municipal area comprises the following settlements (in brackets: number of inhabitants as of January 1, 2026)

- Alt Lenzing (808)
- Haid (54)
- Kraims (55)
- Lenzing (2928)
- Neuhausen (47)
- Oberachmann (355)
- Pichlwang (305)
- Raudaschlmühle (0)
- Reibersdorf (121)
- Thal (205)
- Ulrichsberg (48)
- Unterachmann (380)

=== Neighboring municipalities ===
- Timelkam (north)
- Seewalchen am Attersee (west)
- Schörfling am Attersee (south)
- Aurach am Hongar (east)

== History ==
=== Early history ===
The first settlements around Lake Attersee were established between 4,000 and 3,500 BC. Finds from the Mondsee culture around the Burgstall area in the village of Unterachmann indicate an age of around 6,000 years. Other finds such as an arm spiral in Pichlwang, bowl head needles and fibulae in Pettighofen and an axe in Reibersdorf date back to the Bronze Age (1,300 to 800 BC).

=== Roman age ===
Since about 15 BC, Lenzing belonged to the Roman province of Noricum. This is evidenced by building remains and coins found in Arnbruck on the present-day site of Lenzing AG, as well as clay urns found in Gallaberg. The trade route leading through the Salzkammergut from Hallstatt via Bad Ischl, Weißenbach, Weyregg and Kammer-Schörfling, which joins the Roman trade route between Salzburg (Iuvavum) and Wels (Ovilava) in Oberthalheim, ran along the Ager in the area of today's municipality and fuelled the trade at that time.

=== Middle ages ===
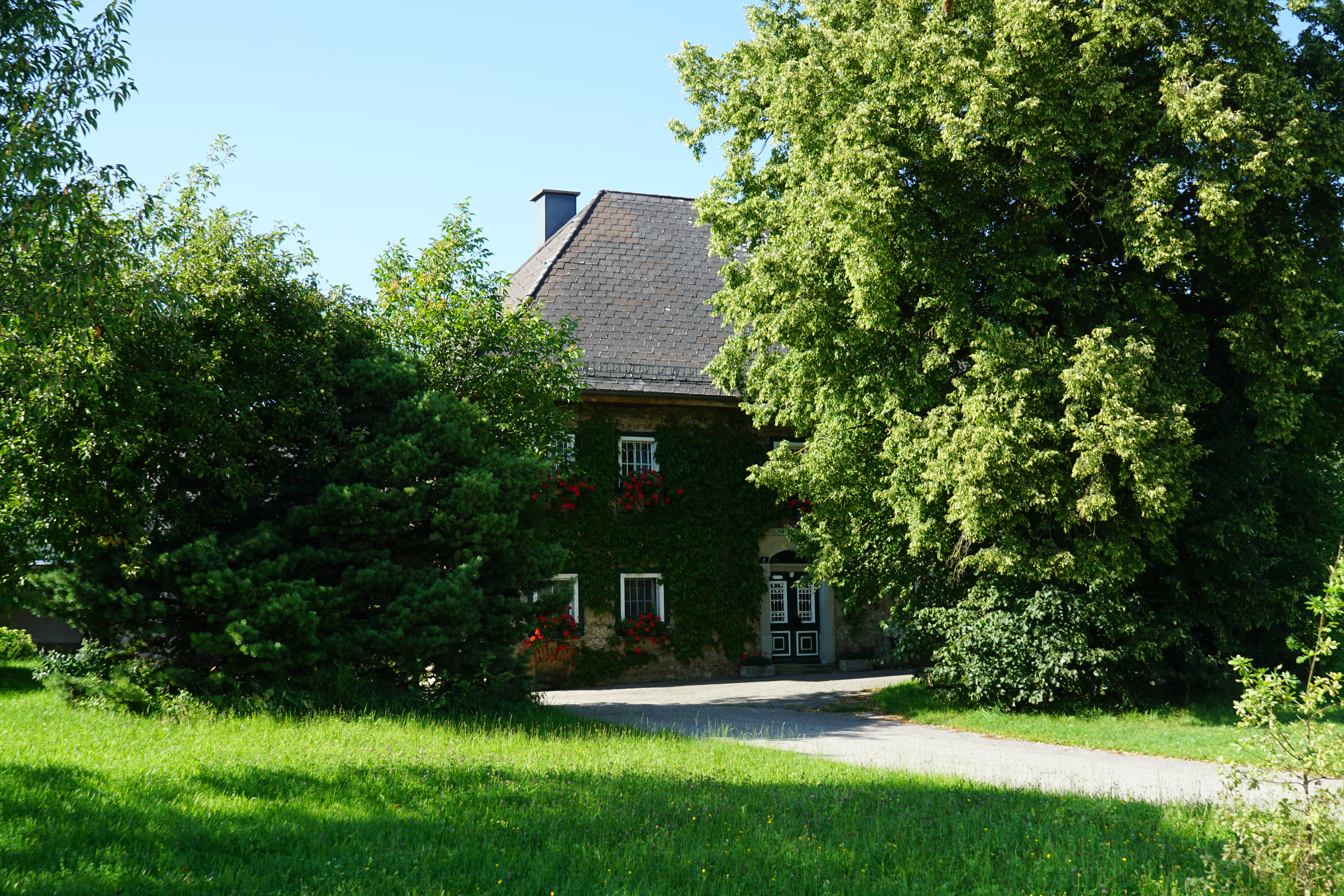
Old farmhouse in Thal

After the Romans had left the area at the end of the 5th century, the Baiuvarii settlers began to take over the Alpine and Danube region between the 7th and 8th centuries. The new settlers mainly inhabited areas where agriculture and livestock farming were possible and were mainly involved in farming and crafts. The first mills on the Ager were also built at this time. Pichlwang (Pirhinwanc) was first mentioned in a deed of donation from Mondsee Monastery in 773. Gallaberg (Galgenberg) appears in a document for the first time in 1299. Arnbruck (Erynbrugge) is mentioned for the first time in the land register of Michaelbeuern Abbey and Oberachmann (Achmann) in the land register of Mattsee Abbey. In 1371, Pettighofen (Petterhofen) and Kraims (Chraims) are mentioned for the first time in the land register of the Schaunberg estate. In 1380 Reibersdorf (Reyberstorff) is mentioned in Albrecht III's feudal register. The name Lenzing (Lennczing) first appears in 1389 and can be traced back to the mythical official Lanzo, who occupied the wooded area on the right bank of the Ager on behalf of his feudal lord in the 11th century. In 1437, 1455 and 1480, the Wengermühle (Steinmühle) mill, Thal (Erichtal) and Neubrunn (Eweprunn) are also mentioned in documents for the first time. Between 1483 and 1504, the Schimmelkirche (Andreas church) was built in Pichelwang under Jakob Herbsleben, which was consecrated on 9 January 1508. Neuhausen is first mentioned in 1561.

=== Modern era ===
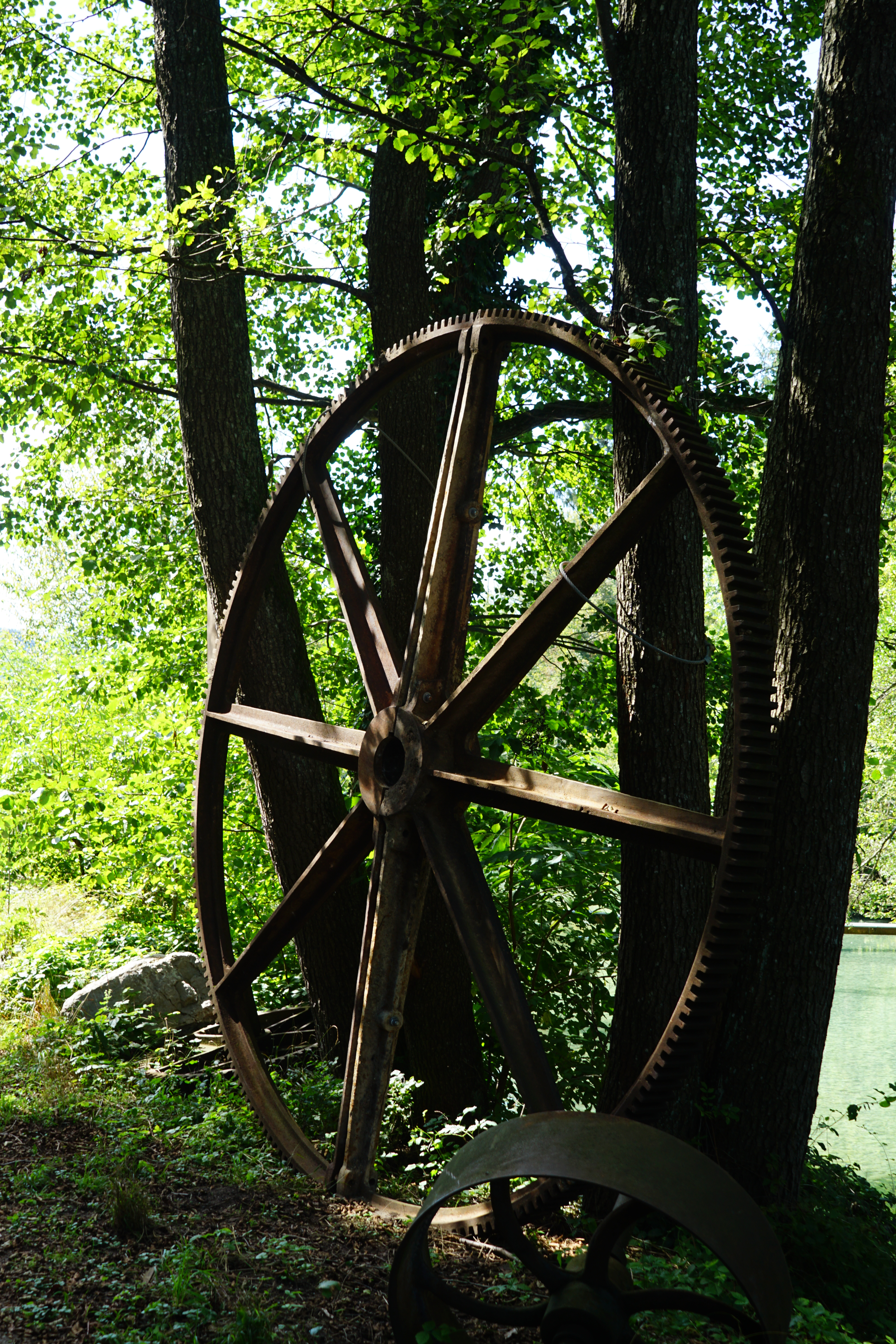
Former gearwheel of the Stingl mill exhibited on a branch of the Ager river

As early as 1561, the Urbar Kammer refers to Ober-Achmann and Nieder-Achmann or Unter-Achmann. With Emperor Joseph II's patent of 1785 on tax and land regulation, Oberachmann became a tax or cadastral municipality. In addition to Oberachmann, this also included the villages of Unterachmann, Kraims, Reibersdorf, Haid, Niederham, Steinbach, Fantaberg, Moos, Wörzing, Neuhausen and Lenzing. By decree of the governor of the crown land ob der Enns dated 31 July 1851, the tax municipality became the political municipality of Oberachmann. It had an area of 10.63 km² and a population of 701. Contrary to the opinion of the provincial committee, and although the people felt they belonged to the parish and market town of Schörfling, there was never a merger with Schörfling. The main reason for this was that they wanted to preserve the independence of their watermills and sawmills on the Ager.

The 1890s marked a turning point for the municipality of Oberachmann, which until then had mainly been dominated by agriculture, when the Ternitz factory magnate Emil Hamburger bought the so-called Starlinger Mühle in Alt Lenzing in 1890 and developed it into a paper mill, a predecessor of today's Lenzing AG.

Since 1918, the area has belonged to the newly founded federal state of Upper Austria.

After the annexation of Austria by the German Reich in 1938, Zellwolle Lenzing AG, the direct predecessor of today's Lenzing AG, was created by the Nazis. In 1939, the a new municipality was formed from the parts of municipality of Oberachmann and by the transfer of territory from neighbouring municipalities against their will. On 1 January 1940, the name of the municipality was changed to Agerzell.

In November 1944, a subcamp of the Mauthausen concentration camp was installed in Pettighofen. The up to 565 prisoners, mostly women, had to perform forced labour, particularly at Lenzinger Zellwolle AG. The camp was liberated by the Third US Army at the start of May 1945.

=== Lenzing ===
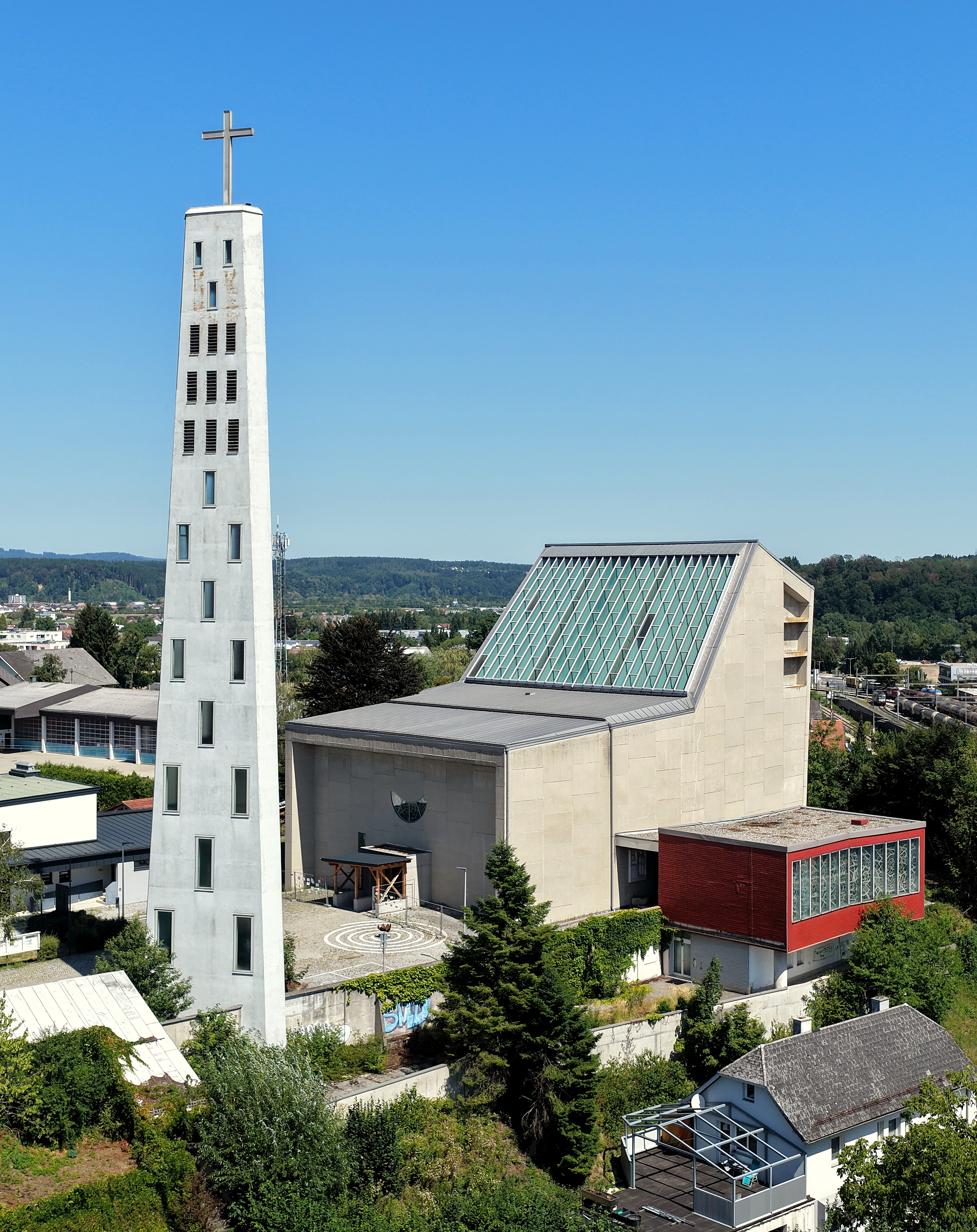
Parish church of Lenzing

In 1945 the Lenzing Nature Friends Association, and in 1947 the Lenzing Children's Friends Association is founded .

On 1 July 1948, the name of the municipality is changed from Agerzell to Lenzing.

The new primary and secondary school is built between 1949 and 1951. The new Roman Catholic parish and the new cemetery are established in 1950. The municipal office, the post office building, the building depot, the gendarmerie building and the cinema on the main square are built from 1953 to 1954. The primary school in Alt Lenzing is built from 1953 to 1955.

The Roman Catholic parish church in Lenzing is built and consecrated between 1959 and 1962. 1963 The municipal library and the municipal kindergarten are built and the green areas around the Wengermühle on the Ager are purchased by the municipality.

On 12 June 1967, the municipality is granted the right to use its own municipal coat of arms.

From 1971 to 1973, the Lenzing Sports Centre is built with an indoor swimming pool, sauna, sports hall and training ground.

In 1978 and 1979, the Goldhauben club and the dance-sport club Lenzing are founded.

On 9 April 1984, the municipality of Lenzing is elevated to market town status.

1993 The old people's and nursing home (APH Lenzing) is completely renovated.

The municipality becomes a European municipality in 1994. The regional planning and development company Vöckla-Ager (REVA) is founded in 1995 together with the municipalities of Vöcklabruck, Regau and Attnang-Puchheim.

In 1996, the new kindergarten in Neubrunn and the renovated indoor swimming pool are officially opened.

In 2003, the Lenzing Cultural Centre (KUZ Lenzing) is opened with a cultural hall, music school and rehearsal rooms for the music association and the singers' association.

The renovation and expansion of the retirement and nursing home is completed in 2007.

2009 The Lenzing bypass of the B151 highway is opened.

2012 Completion of the new primary and secondary school with triple gymnasium in Thal.

2015 Construction of the Lenzing-centre residential park on the site of the former primary and secondary school.

The new fire station in Reibersdorf is opened in 2016.

In 2018, the municipality purchased the former vicarage to convert it into a community museum, but the project was never realised and the vicarage fell into disrepair.

On 17 September 2024, the municipal council under Mayor Rudolf Vogtenhuber unanimously decided to apply to the state government of Upper Austria to elevate the municipality to the status of a city and to add the suffix ‘an der Ager’ to the municipality's name.

With resolution LGBl. No. 106/2024 of the state government of Upper Austria from 18 November 2024, the market town of Lenzing was given the name suffix ‘an der Ager’. The town signs were replaced at the beginning of 2025.

== Culture and places of interest ==
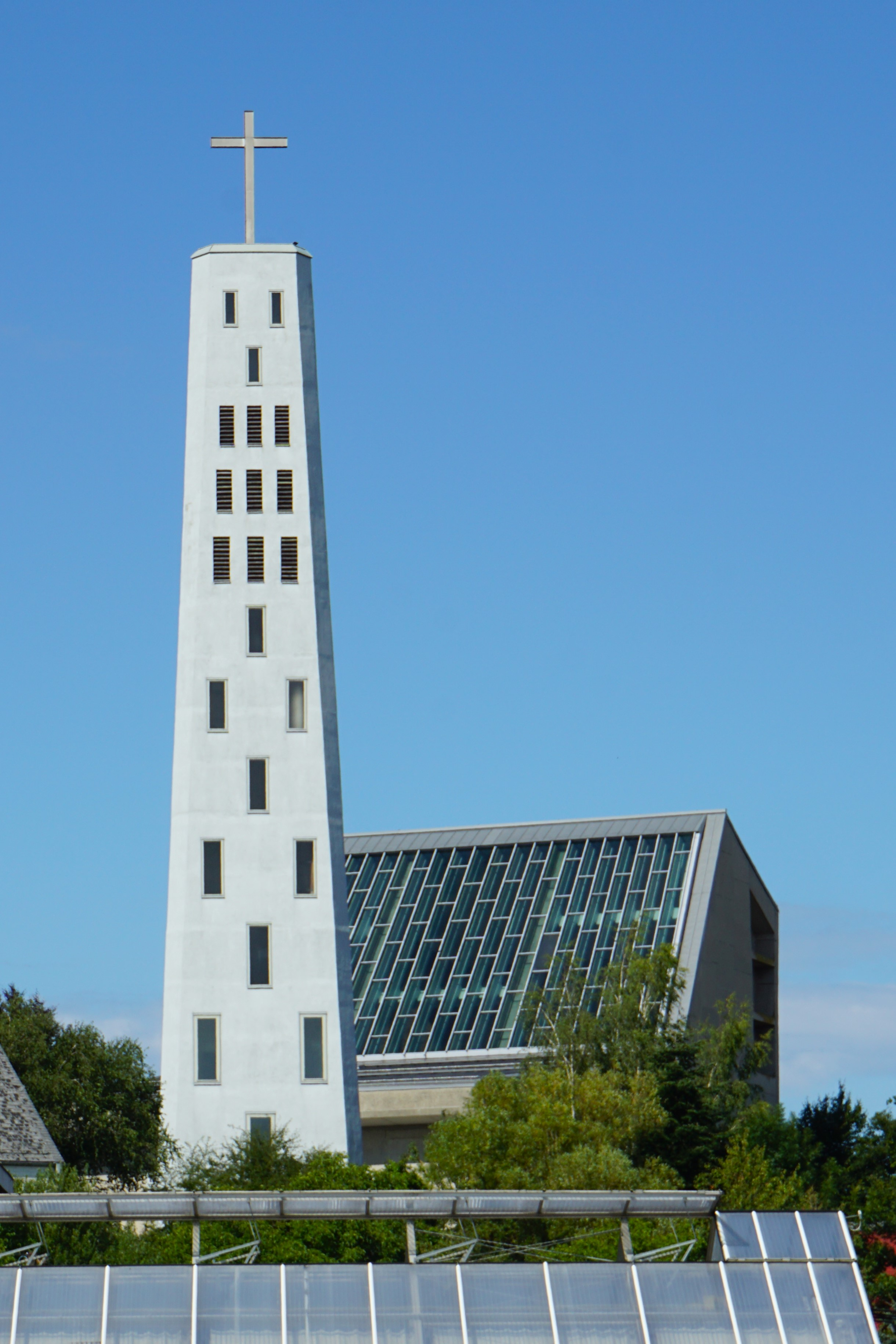
Parish church of Lenzing an der Ager

Catholic parish church in Lenzing an der Ager: After the parish of Lenzing was founded, pastor Meindl was commissioned by Bishop Josef Fließer to initiate a church building programme. However, due to limited financial resources, the municipality's plan to build a classical church on the main square, where the Lichtspiele is located today, could not be realised. Instead, it was decided to build the church on a plot of land that was already available on the outskirts of the town. In keeping with the zeitgeist of the time, it was decided to build the church as a reinforced concrete structure according to the plans of architect Hans Aigner. The unusual shape of the church was deliberately chosen to blend in with the neighbouring industrial complex of Lenzing AG. The church was intended not to be a foreign body, but to remind visitors of factory halls. For this reason, the 42 metre high, six-sided church tower was built as a stand-alone campanile in the style of an industrial chimney. Construction work began in early 1959, allowing the church to be consecrated to the Holy Spirit shortly before the Second Vatican Council in mid-1962. Today's opinion of the Lenzing parish church is divided, with some people appreciating it for its modern architecture and others criticising its remote location and dull architecture.

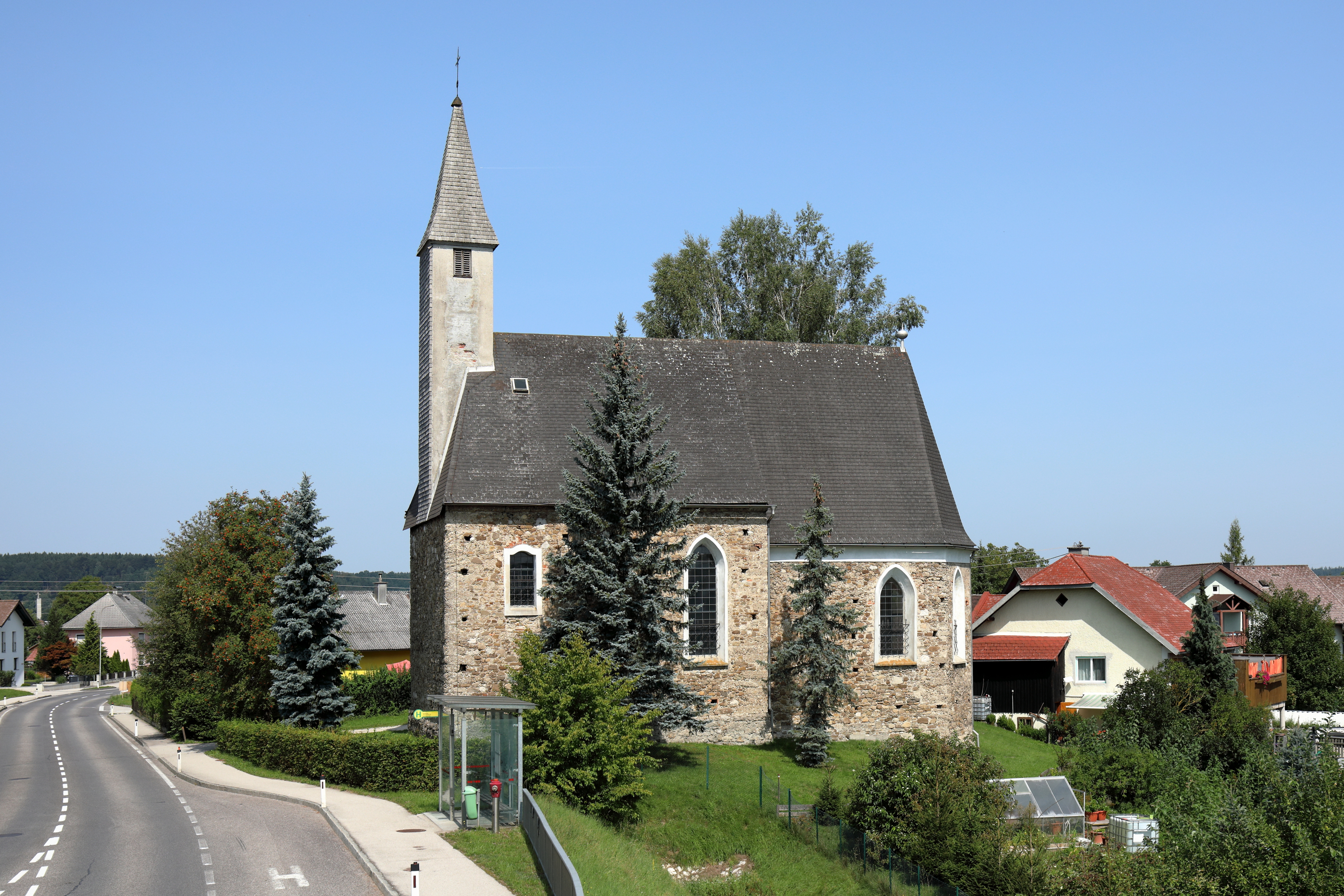
Schimmelkirche Pichlwang

Catholic Schimmelkirche church in Pichlwang: The period between 1470 and 1520 was a golden age in the history of Gothic church building. New churches were built in many places in the area at this time. For example in Seewalchen am Attersee, Gampern, Vöcklabruck, Schörfling am Attersee, Steinbach am Attersee and Weyregg am Attersee. The construction of today's Schimmelkirche was begun under Jakob Herbsleben, the parish priest of the then large parish of Maria Schöndorf from 1483 to 1504, and completed in 1508. As the certificate of consecration from 1508 shows, today's Schimmelkirche is a new building, which indicates that an earlier church already existed on this site before 1508. The church was initially a branch church of the greater Schöndorf parish before becoming part of the Oberthalheim parish in 1782. After the area west of the Ager on which the church stands was ceded to France in 1809 as part of the Treaty of Schönbrunn, the former Schimmelkirche was converted into a protestant prayer house. After the protestant parish of Vöcklabruck-Pichlwang was dissolved in 1825 following disagreements with Rutzenmoos, the prayer house was closed in 1826 and returned to the Catholic parish of Oberthalheim. By 1844, the church had been repaired for 300 guilders in the course of the Vormärz period to repair the damage caused by the French wars. From 1935, regular church services were held in the Schimmelkirche by Seewalchen priests. Due to the sharp increase in the population in the area since 1938, a co-operative branch of the Seewalchen parish was created in 1941, whose place of service was the Schimmelkirche. The Schimmelkirche can therefore be regarded as the founding church of the later parish of Lenzing an der Ager.

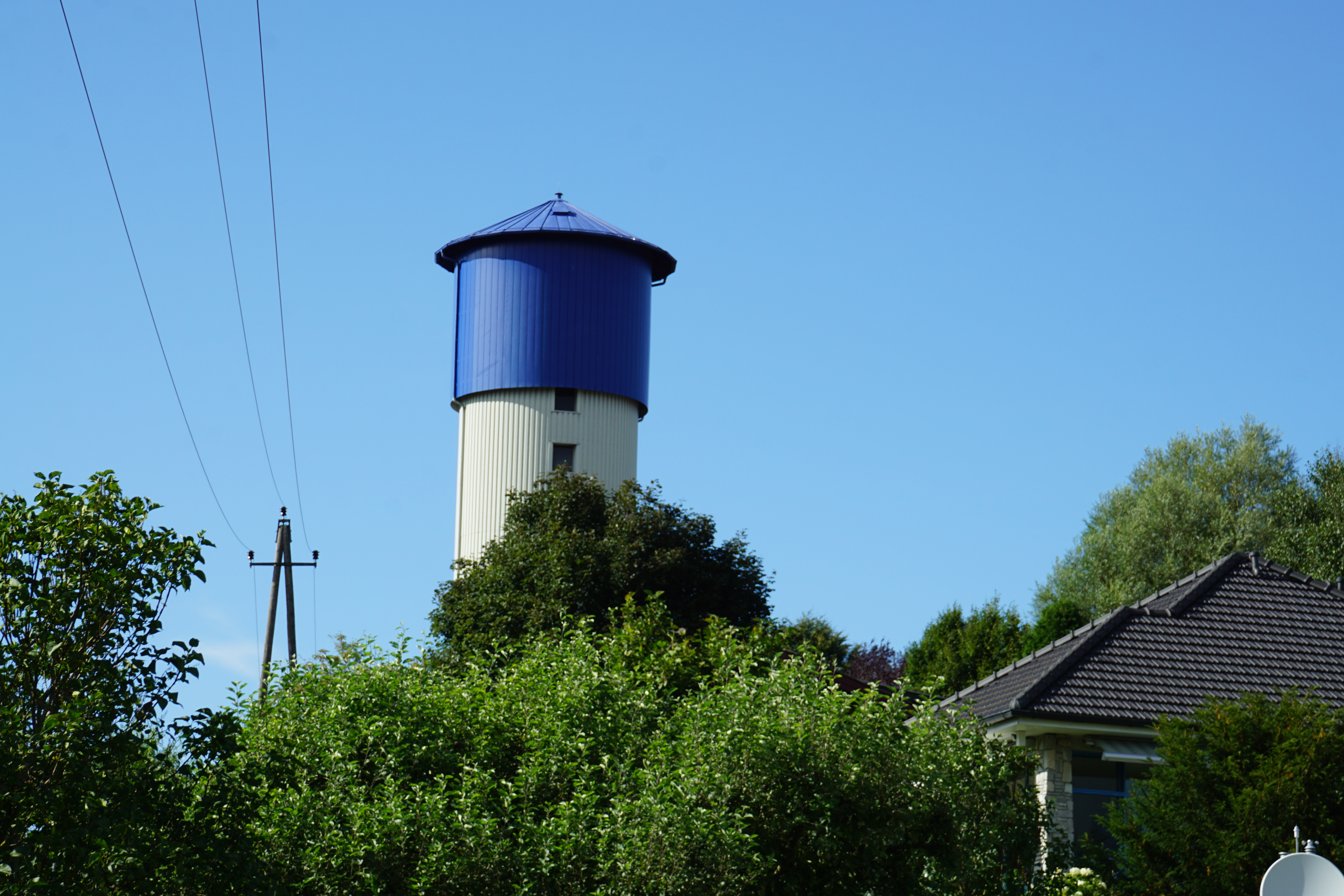
Neubrunn water tower

Neubrunn water tower: Located near the municipal border with Seewalchen am Attersee, on the highest point of the Siedlungsberg hill, the Neubrunn water tower can be seen from afar thanks to its eye-catching blue cladding. With a reservoir volume of 150 m³ (5300 ft³), it accounts for around 10% of the total reservoir capacity of the waterworks in the municipality of Lenzing an der Ager and therefore plays a key role in maintaining the supply pressure in the distribution network.

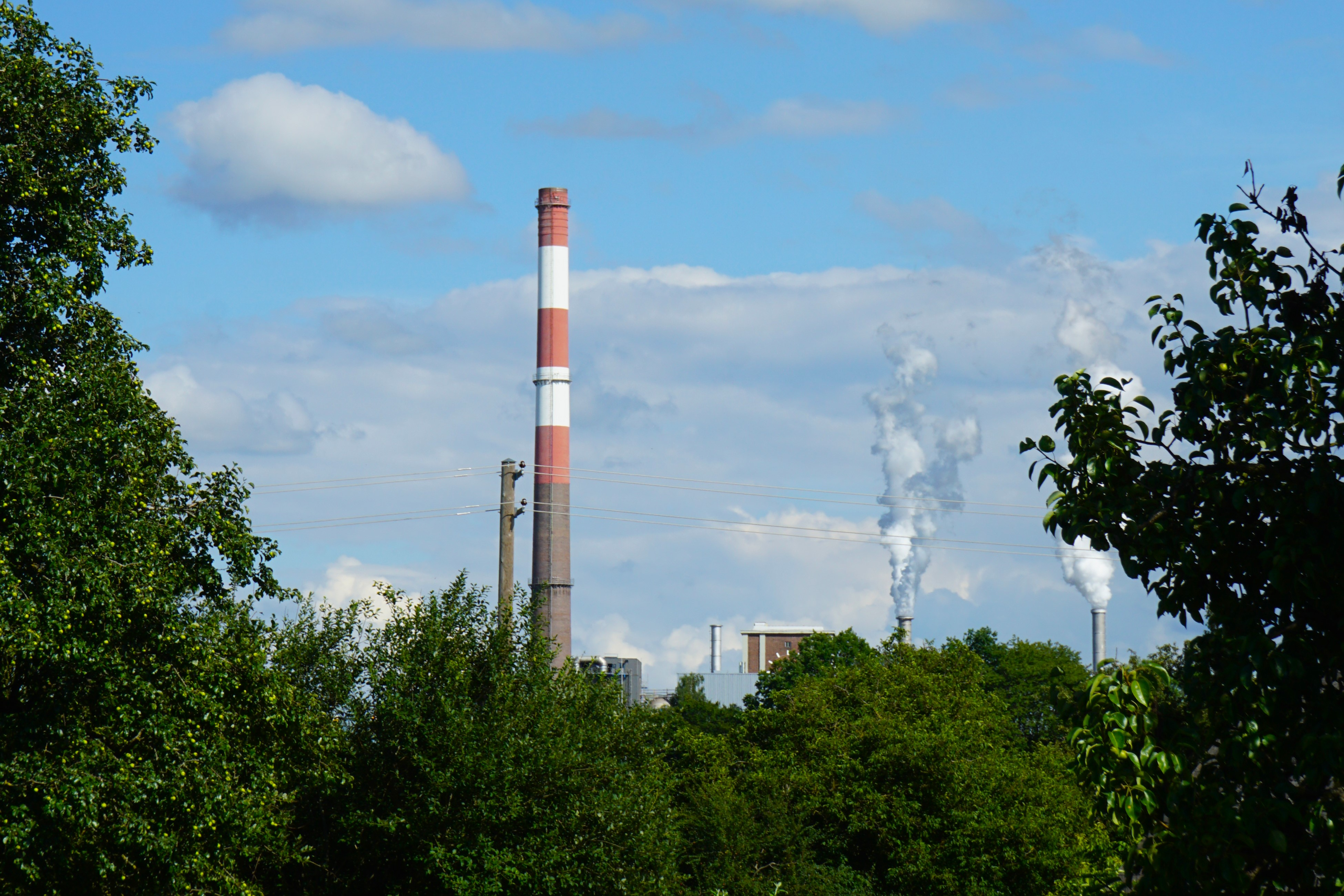
Chimney of the Lenzing AG

Lenzing AG chimney: Probably one of the most famous structures in the area of the municipality of Lenzing an der Ager is the 152.5 m (500 ft) high chimney of the Lenzing AG. It was built between 1938 and 1939 under the official name Kamin Energie I and was the tallest chimney in Europe when it was completed. With a base diameter of 11.2 m (36 ft) and a top diameter of 6.7 m (22 ft), it can be seen far beyond the boundaries of the municipality. The approx. 2 million clinker bricks, which were required for the wall thickness of between 0.25 and 1.5 m (0.2 and 5 ft), give the chimney a considerable weight of 12,500 metric tonnes (27,500,000 lbs). As a potential obstacle to aviation, the upper half of the chimney is not only painted traffic red and traffic white, but also features flashing red obstacle/hazard lights that can be seen for dozens of kilometres away.

== Economy and infrastructure ==
=== Transport ===
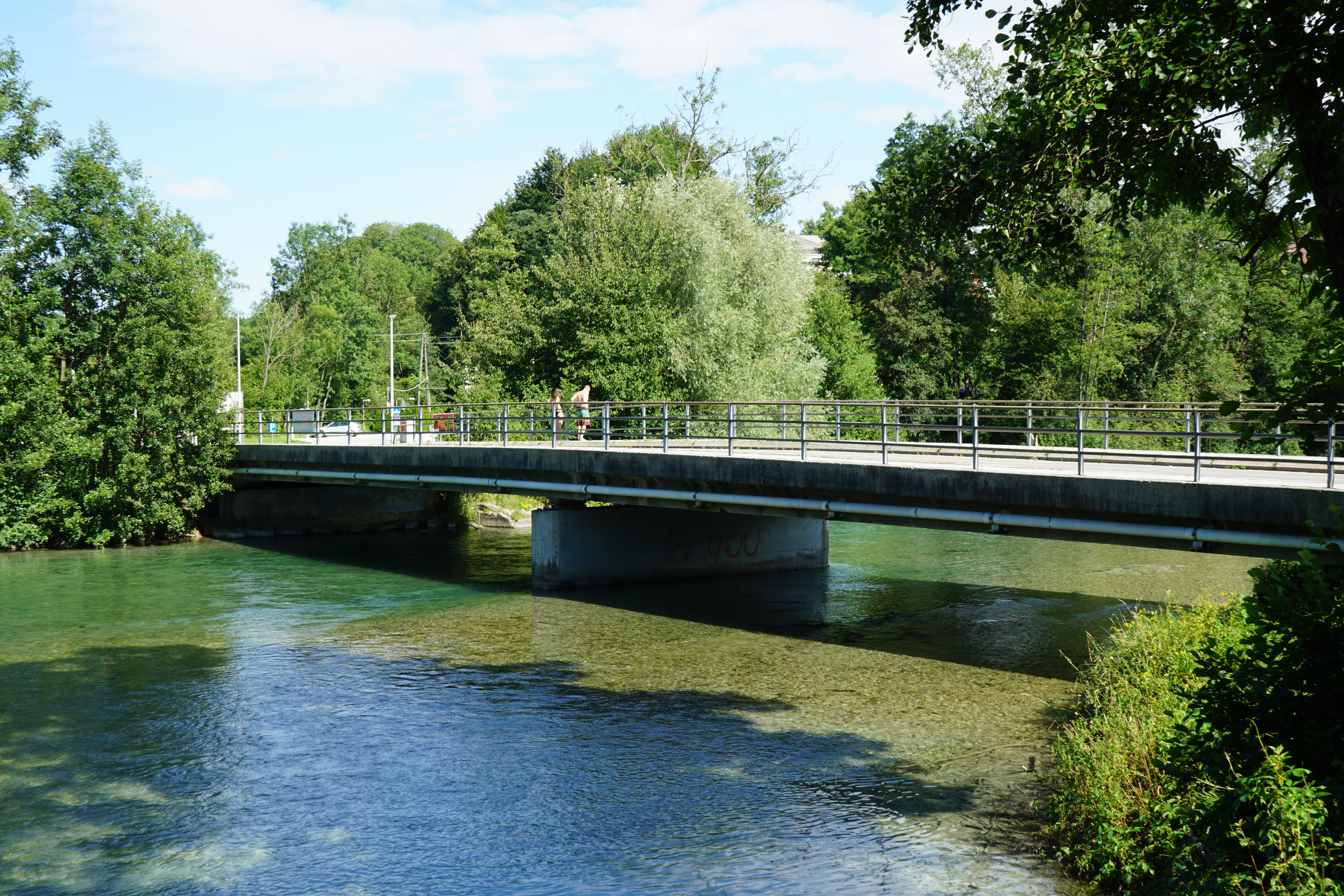
Ager bridge between Oberachmann and Pettighofen

The single-track, electrified Kammerer railway runs through the municipality. Coming from Vöcklabruck, it branches off from the Western Railway in Timelkam and leads to Kammer-Schörfling at Lake Attersee. The stations Lenzing Bhf. of the Lenzing AG, and Lenzing Ort near the town centre, which are located in the municipal area, are served by Austrian Federal Railways (ÖBB) every hour from Monday to Friday, and every two hours at weekends. The trains used for this, mostly Talent and Desiro ML, and occasionally also CityShuttle with class 1044/1144, are sometimes continued to Attnang-Puchheim.

Coming from Timelkam, the Attersee road B151 leads through the municipality to Seewalchen.

The municipality is bordered to the south by the A1 West Autobahn, but the entrances and exits are in the municipality of Schörfling.

== Public facilities ==
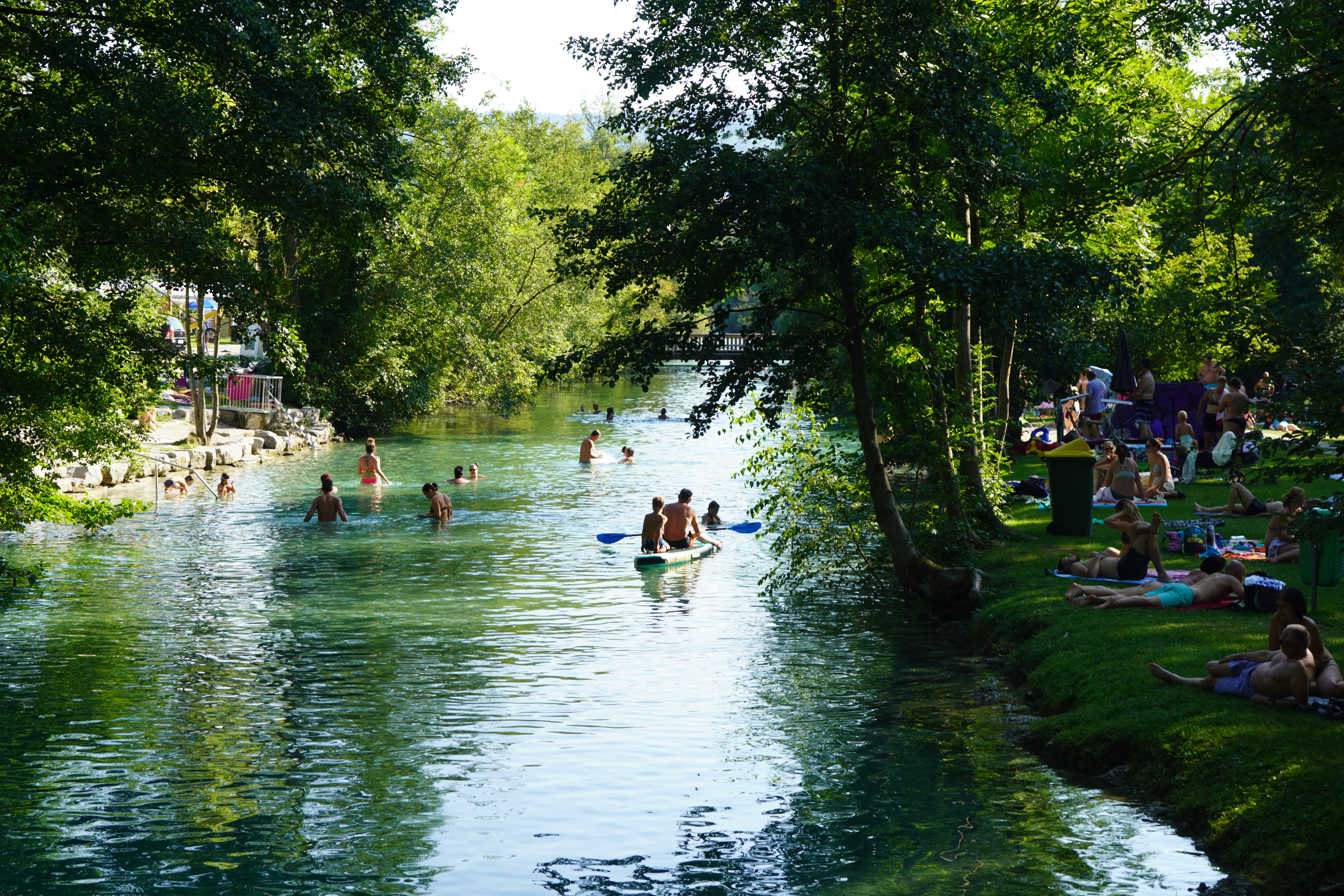
Ager island in Oberachmann

- Kindergarten Burgstall
- Kindergarten Neubrunn
- Primary school Alt Lenzing
- Primary school Lenzing
- Secondary sports school Lenzing
- After-school care in the school centre
- Regional music school Lenzing
- Adult education centre Lenzing
- Ager island outdoor swimming area
- Community library
- Triple sports hall
- Lenzing parent-child centre
- Dog off-leash area Agerstraße
- Lenzing cultural centre
- Lichtspiele (cinema)
- Lenzing retirement and nursing home
- Lenzing waterworks
- Lenzing building yard

== Politics ==
With the municipal council and mayoral elections in Upper Austria 2021, the municipal council has the following distribution:

- 14 Social Democratic Party of Austria (SPÖ)
- 7 Freedom Party of Austria (FPÖ)
- 5 Austrian People's Party (ÖVP)
- 5 Greens

In prior elections it was:

- 1949: 13 SPÖ, 6 VdU, 3 ÖVP and 2 KPÖ
- 1955: 18 SPÖ, 4 ÖVP, 1 FPÖ, and 1 KPÖ
- 1961: 22 SPÖ, 5 ÖVP, 2 FPÖ and 1 KLS
- 1967: 26 SPÖ, 4 ÖVP and 1 FPÖ
- 1973: 24 SPÖ, 5 ÖVP and 2 FPÖ
- 1979: 24 SPÖ, 5 ÖVP and 2 FPÖ
- 1985: 26 SPÖ, 4 ÖVP and 1 FPÖ
- 1991: 24 SPÖ, 4 ÖVP and 3 FPÖ
- 1997: 22 SPÖ, 6 FPÖ and 3 ÖVP
- 2003: 23 SPÖ, 5 ÖVP and 3 FPÖ
- 2009: 19 SPÖ, 6 ÖVP and 6 FPÖ
- 2015: 18 SPÖ, 8 FPÖ and 5 ÖVP

=== Mayors ===
The mayors of Oberachmann until 1939 were:

- 1850–1860 Sebastian Baumgartinger
- 1860–1864 Ferdinand Sturm
- 1864–1867 Wolfgang Scherndl
- 1867–1870 Josef Fellner
- 1870–1873 Josef Apfel
- 1873–1876 Anton Huemer
- 1876–1879 Mathias Haminger
- 1879–1885 Michael Katterl
- 1885–1894 Josef Wenger
- 1894–1897 Franz Starzinger
- 1897–1900 Ferdinand Sturm
- 1900–1903 Franz Starzinger
- 1903–1906 Franz Lenzenwöger
- 1906–1909 Ferdinand Sturm
- 1909–1919 Franz Lenzenwöger
- 1919–1924 Franz Ecker
- 1924–1938 Josef Kofler
- 1938–1940 Georg Piram

The mayors of Agerzell from 1939 to 1945 were:

- 1940–1945 Walther Schieber
- 1945–1945 Josef Staufer
- 1945–1947 Adolf Springer
- 1947–1948 Franz Kupata

The mayors of Lenzing since 1948 have been:

- 1948–1959 Franz Kupata (SPÖ)
- 1959–1975 Raimund Jurkowitsch (SPÖ)
- 1975–1986 Rudolf Kneifl (SPÖ)
- 1986–1991 Franz Wimmer (SPÖ)
- 1991–2003 Roland Stiebler (SPÖ)
- 2003–2013 Walter Franz Geisberger (SPÖ)
- since 2013 Rudolf Vogtenhuber (SPÖ)

=== Holdings ===
The Gemeinnützige Siedlungsgesellschaft m.b.H. (commonly known as GSG-Lenzing) is a subsidiary of the market town of Lenzing an der Ager. The mayor of the municipality is automatically a member of the executive board.

=== Coat of arms ===
The coat of arms, which was awarded in 1967, is the result of an ideas competition organised by the municipality. The tree and retort refer to the timber, paper and cellulose industries that characterised the town, while the wavy bar symbolises the river Ager, which made it possible for these businesses to establish in the first place.

=== Twin towns ===
The market town of Lenzing an der Ager maintains a municipal partnership with the Baden-Württemberg municipality of Bisingen in Germany.

== Notable people ==
=== Honorary citizen ===
- Mark W. Clark (1946)
- Josef Kofler (1951)
- Franz Herbst (1951)
- Mathias Hoftberger (1956)
- Raimund Jurkowitch (1976)
- Hans Winter (1985)
- Kurt Steyrer (1985)
- Josef Ratzenböck (1985)
- Karl Grünner (1985)
- Rudolf Kneifl (1986)
- Roland Stiebler (2003)
