= Schörfling am Attersee =

- Municipality
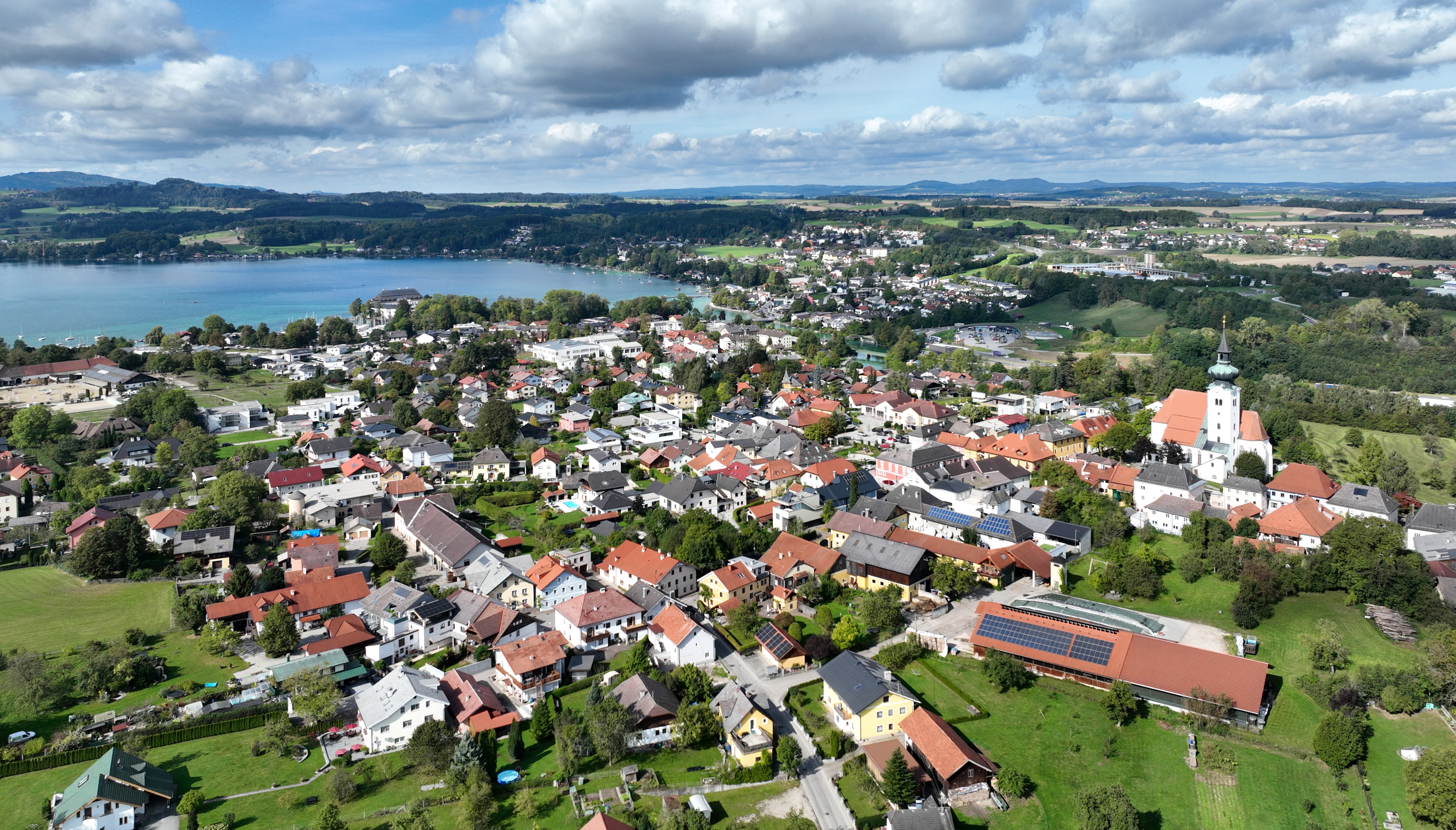
- Schöfling with the northern part of lake Attersee in the background

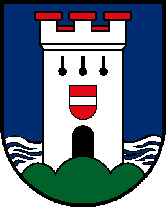
- Coat of arms

- Location within Austria
- Coordinates: 47°56′50″N 13°36′02″E
- Country: Austria, EU
- State: Upper Austria
- District: Vöcklabruck

Government
  - Mayor: Gerhard Gründl (SPÖ)

Area
  - Total: 23.22 km^{2} (8.97 sq mi)
- Elevation: 512 m (1,680 ft)

Population (2026)
  - Total: 3,526
  - Density: 151.9/km^{2} (393.3/sq mi)
- Time zone: UTC+1 (CET)
  - Summer (DST): UTC+2 (CEST)
- Postal code: 4861
- Area code: 07662
- Vehicle registration: VB

Schörfling am Attersee is a market town in Upper Austria in the district of Vöcklabruck in the Hausruckviertel with 3526 inhabitants (as of January 1, 2026). The responsible judicial district is Vöcklabruck.

== Geography ==
Schörfling am Attersee lies at an altitude of 512 m above sea level along lake Attersee and the Ager river. It streches 7.7 km from north to south and 5.9 km from west to east. The total area covers 23.23 km^{2}. Around 44.8% of the area is forested, 33.6% is used for agriculture.

=== Municipal division ===
The municipal area comprises the following settlements (in brackets: number of inhabitants as of January 1, 2026)

- Fantaberg (82)
- Kammer (489)
- Marktwald (23)
- Moos (95)
- Niederham (57)
- Oberhehenfeld (876)
- Schörfling (1678)
- Steinbach (59)
- Sulzberg (129)
- Wörzing (38)

=== Neighboring municipalities ===
- Seewalchen am Attersee (west)
- Berg im Attergau (south-west)
- Weyregg am Attersee (south)
- Aurach am Hongar (east)
- Lenzing an der Ager (north)

== History ==
=== Early history ===
Schörfling lies on the northern coast of Lake Attersee. The remains of the lake dwellings, which date back to around 3750 BC, provide significant evidence of early historical settlement in the Attergau region. The gradual Christianisation of the region is thought to have begun as early as the late Roman Empire, which had extended its borders as far as the Danube following the conquest of the Celtic kingdom of Noricum in 15 BC.

A local legend tells the story of a Roman patrician who owned a country estate on Lake Attersee, on the site of what is now Kammer Castle. Whilst his daughter Flavia was staying in Rome for her education, she came into contact with Christianity. On her return home, Flavia refused to renounce her new faith, so her father had her chained naked to a small boat and set adrift down the Ager river. At the confluence of the Traun and Ager rivers, the girl was rescued by shepherds. Today, the market town and collegiate church coat of arms of Lambach, which depicts Flavia in the boat, still commemorates this legend.

=== Middle ages ===
In the 6th century AD, as part of the migration period, Baiuvarii settlers advanced into the area that is now Upper Austria, which subsequently became the heartland of the Baiuvarii tribal duchy. Like many places in the surrounding area, Schörfling has a name of Baiuvarii origin. From the 7th century onwards, Christianity spread amongst the Baiuvarii, preached by the remnant Christian communities dating back to Roman times and by missionaries from the Frankish Kingdom and Ireland. To consolidate the Christian faith and in the interests of land development, Duke Odilo founded Mondsee Abbey in 748. When Charlemagne deposed Duke Tassilo in 778, all property naturally passed to the Franks, and the Aterhofen estate (now Attersee) became Frankish crown property. Schörfling is first mentioned in writing in 803 as Sceroluingen in a deed of donation to the monastery.

Until 1200, Schörfling came under the jurisdiction of the parish of Altmünster. The exact date of the founding of the Schörfling parish is not recorded, but it may safely be assumed to have been in the 12th century, a period which saw a comprehensive expansion of the parish organisation within the Diocese of Passau, which had jurisdiction over the area at that time. In 1221, the parish passed as a fief to the powerful Schaunberg dynasty, who exercised their rule over the Attergau from the neighbouring lake fortress of Kammer. In 1260, a parish priest named Konrad of Schörfling is mentioned for the first time. In 1383, the ecclesiastical fief of Schirflingen passed to the House of Habsburg, which ceded it to the Khevenhüller family 200 years later.

By the late Middle Ages, the village had grown in economic importance. In 1499 it was granted market town status and its population grew steadily. However, life in Schörfling at that time was also marked by peasant unrest. The peasants, some of whom were still living in serfdom, rose up against their landlords as their economic situation deteriorated rapidly.

=== Reformation ===
The inhabitants of Schörfling hoped that Martin Luther’s Reformation movement would offer a way out of their plight. The parish briefly embraced the new doctrine. However, in the wake of the Counter-Reformation, the patron, Franz Christoph Khevenhüller, appointed a Catholic priest, and the parish returned to its former faith. Through the revival of devotion to the Virgin Mary and the construction of a Loreto chapel at the parish church, Schörfling once again developed a deep Catholic spiritual life; in the 17th century, it even became a destination for pilgrimages, which only came to an end during the Enlightenment (1787). At that time, there was also a major reorganisation within the Church. In 1785, the Austrian Danube regions, which had belonged to the Diocese of Passau for more than 1,000 years, were separated from the mother diocese and assigned to the newly established regional dioceses. The Diocese of Linz was thus created for Upper Austria. As part of the reorganisation of the deaneries, Schörfling became the seat of a deanery which still comprises 11 parishes today.

== Culture and places of interest ==
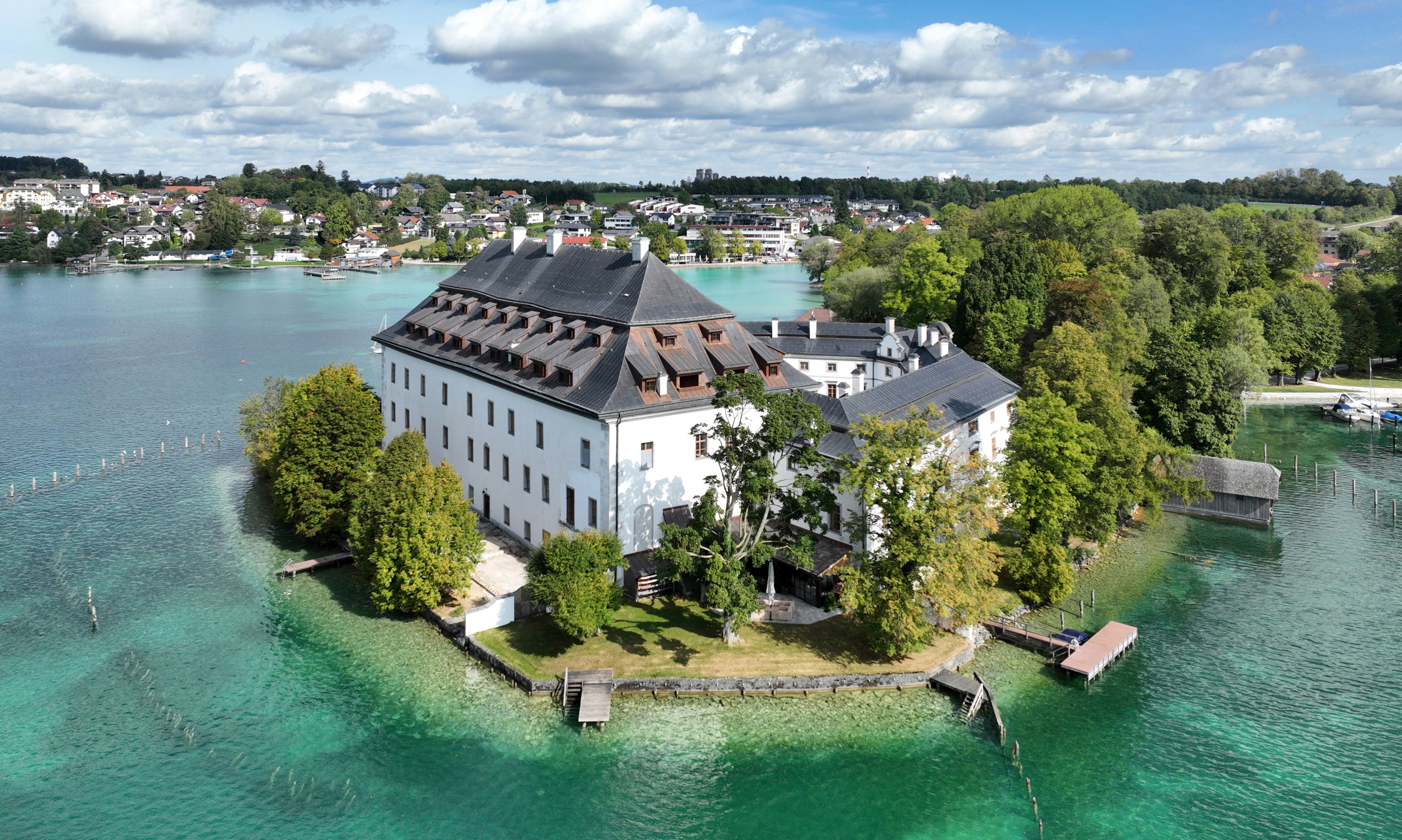
Kammer Castle, view from the south with Seewalchen in the background.

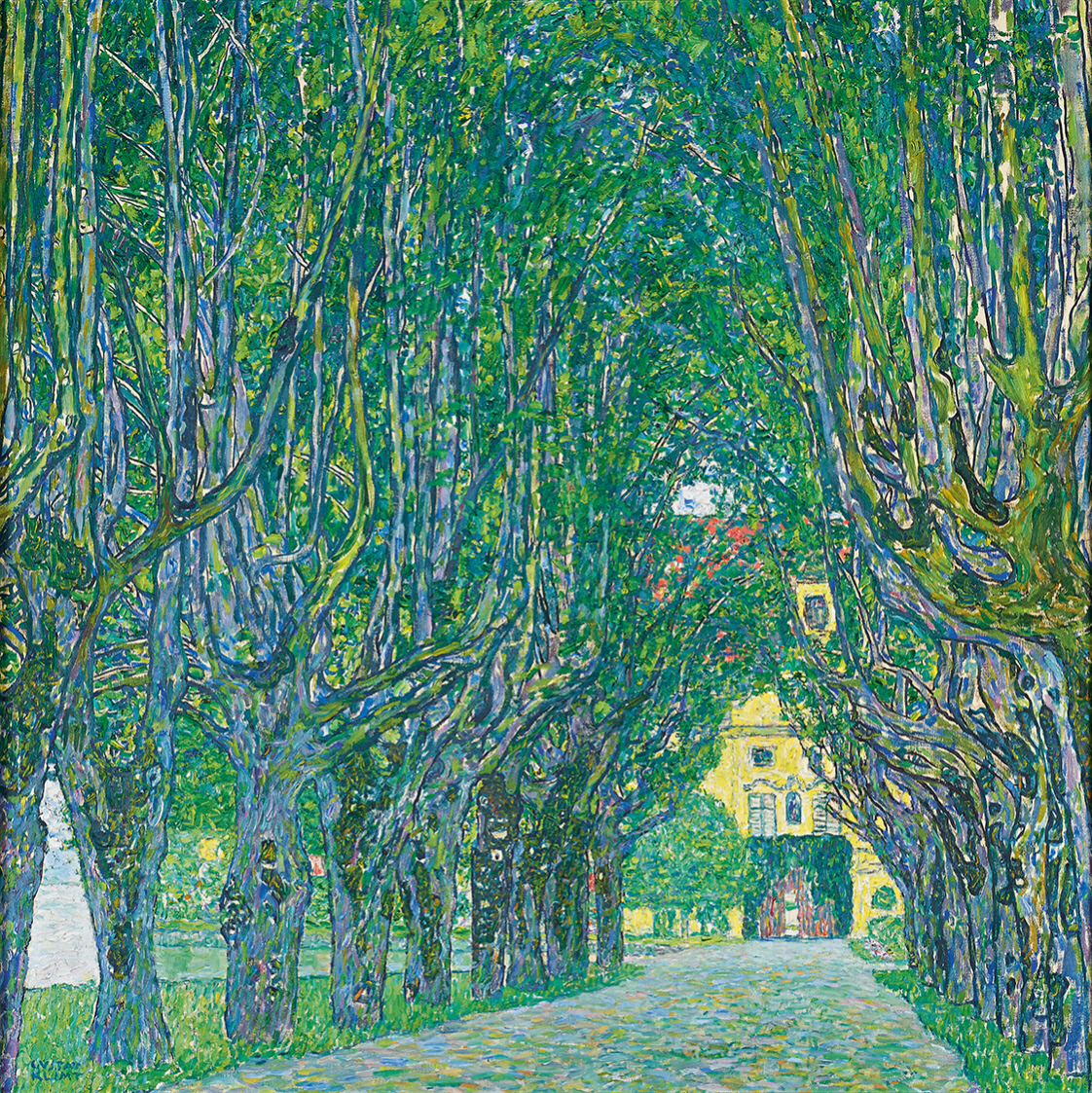
Oil painting of Kammer Castle by Gustav Klimt in summer 1912.

- Kammer Castle: Once situated on an island, this massive, rectangular, three-storey building now stands merely on a peninsula. Two low side wings enclose a courtyard. The first owner was Haidfalk von Chammer in 1165. From 1200 onwards, a fortified stronghold stood here, belonging to the Schaunberg family and, as their fief, becoming the centre of the Attergau region. Later, ownership passed to the Wallseer family, the Habsburgs and the Khevenhüller family. The land bridge connecting it to the island was filled in, and the castle was transformed into a palace. Until the early 1990s, the palace was owned by the Jeszensky family, who also managed the adjacent Meierhof farm. At the end of the 1990s, ownership passed to the former Olympic dressage champion (Moscow 1980), Sissy Max-Theurer, who renovated the palace, which had been on the verge of falling into disrepair.

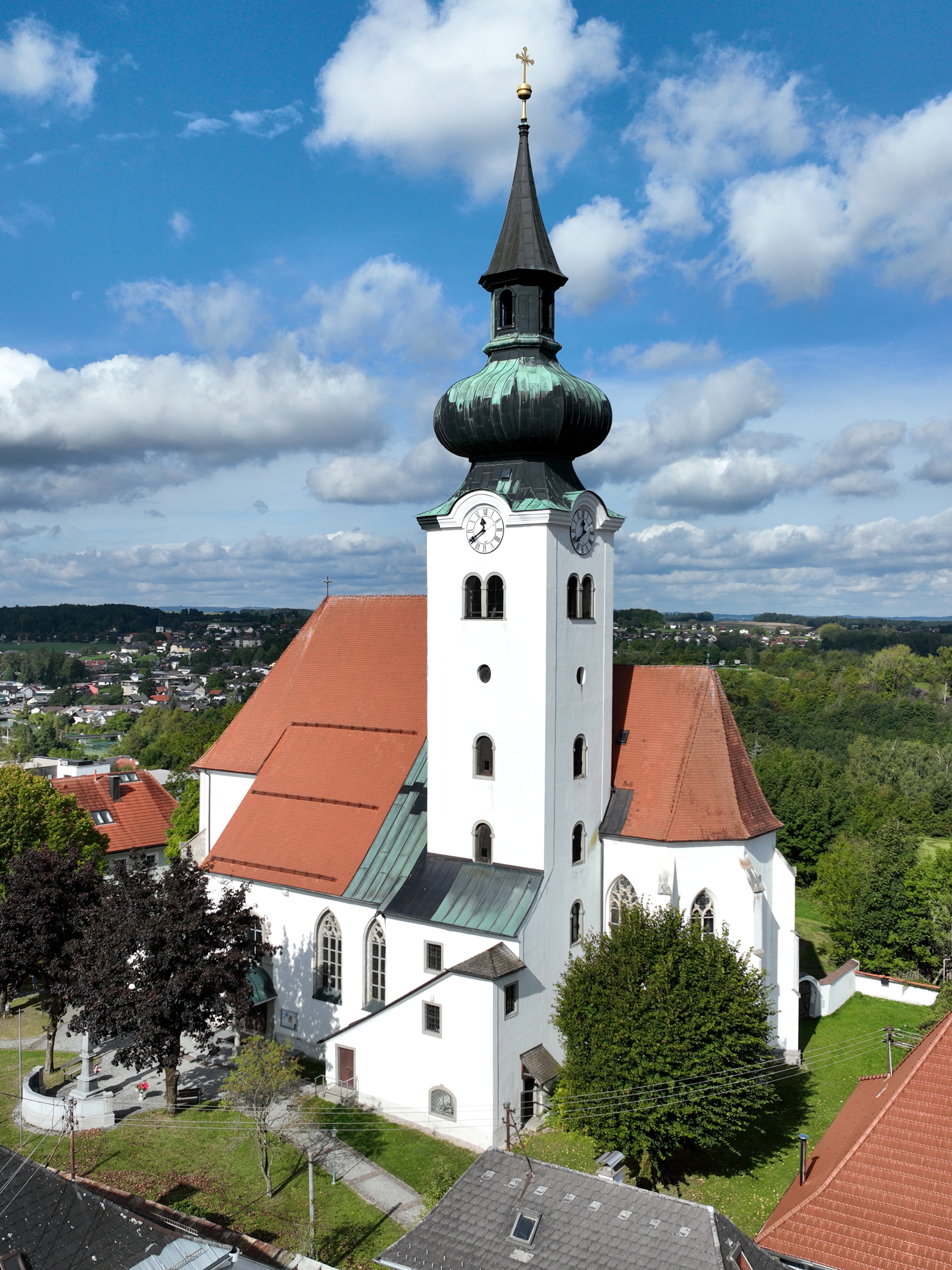
Schörfling Parish Church

- Schörfling Parish Church: Originally, the first Christians in this area wanted to build the church in Hainbach (formerly the parish of Schörfling, now Aurach). But overnight, the foundation stone had disappeared. So a new foundation stone was hewn and laid. But the next morning, it was no longer in the ground either. When this happened a third time, the foundation stone was loaded onto an ox-drawn cart. The oxen were allowed to run free. They came to a halt at the highest point in Schörfling. The Schörfling parish church was built on this spot. The parish church of St Gallus is a tall late-Gothic building with three central pillars. It is said to have been built by Stefan Wultinger; however, much earlier, monks from St Gallen had erected a place of worship here. On the first central pillar there is a late-Gothic relief of St Nicholas. At his feet is a coat of arms featuring crossed oar blades, identifying him as the patron saint of sailors and raftsmen. The late-Gothic entrance hall was redesigned as the church's main entrance during the Baroque period. On the right-hand wall of the entrance hall hangs a mortuary plaque of Baron von Egg and Hungersbach. The death shield is richly decorated and bears the inscription: ‘Here lies buried the noble-born Volckhart, Baron of Egg … and of the Windische March, who died on 24 December in the year 1608.’ The practice of placing death shields alongside epitaphs dates back to the Middle Ages and was reserved for the nobility. During the era of religious division, this custom became more widespread because – particularly in smaller churches – it was not possible to erect a raised tomb for every nobleman. The death shield evolved from the Germanic custom of placing the deceased's weapons in the grave or hanging them by the grave. From around 1400, the death shield, in the shape of a disc, was created to replace the battle shield.
- Loreto Chapel: The Loreto Chapel was built in 1638. Surrounding the actual shrine on the western edge of the parish church was an enclosed cloister, which in turn formed a chapel above and around the shrine; this chapel burnt down in 1787 and was not rebuilt. The chapel housed the statue of Mary of Loreto, an object of worship.

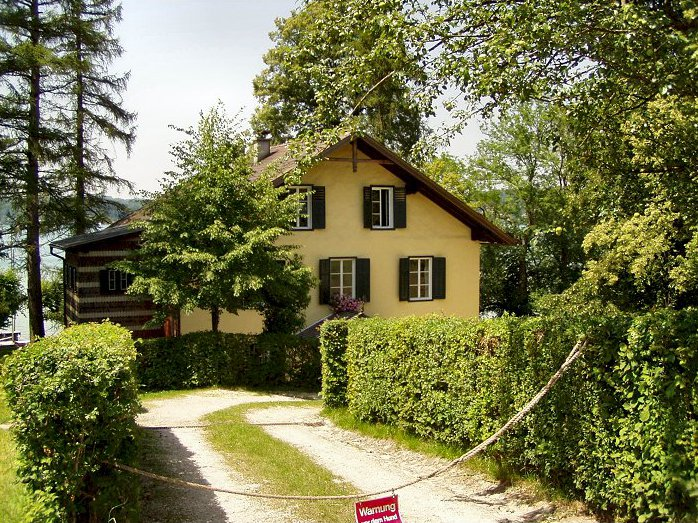
Villa Oleander at lake Attersee

- Gustav Klimt Theme Trail: Gustav Klimt's discovery of lake Attersee as a summer retreat began in the summer of 1900, almost 50 years after the first steps were taken to develop tourism in the region. Between 1908 and 1912, he stayed at Villa Oleander in the village of Kammer. During this period, the artist created 11 landscape paintings featuring motifs from Lake Attersee. Villa Oleander was built in 1879 by the then owner of Kammer Castle, the last Countess Khevenhüller, and was let out during the summer months. From the villa's boathouse, the artist painted Kammer Castle in four different versions, amongst other works. On a walk along the Gustav Klimt Theme Trail, which runs along the promenade in Kammer-Schörfling and Seewalchen, visitors gain an insight into Klimt's life and work, as well as the motifs that inspired his art in the surroundings of his summer residences, Villa Paulick and Villa Oleander, on the northern coast of lake Attersee.

== Politics ==
With the municipal council and mayoral elections in Upper Austria 2021, the municipal council has the following distribution:

- 11 Social Democratic Party of Austria (SPÖ)
- 6 Austrian People's Party (ÖVP)
- 4 Freedom Party of Austria (FPÖ).
- 4 Greens

In prior elections it was:

- 2015: 10 SPÖ, 7 ÖVP, 5 FPÖ and 3 Greens
- 2009: 14 SPÖ, 7 ÖVP and 4 FPÖ
- 2003: 13 SPÖ, 9 ÖVP and 3 FPÖ

=== Mayors ===
- 2003 – 2021 Gerhard Gründl (SPÖ)
- since 2021 Gerhard Gründl jnr. (SPÖ)

=== Twin towns ===
The market town of Schörfling am Attersee maintains a municipal partnership with the hessian municipality of Wanfried in Germany.

== Notable people ==
=== Honorary citizen ===
- Josef Wenger (1840–1903), founder of the Schörfling volunteer fire brigade and the beautification association

=== Sons and daughters of the municipality ===
- Hubert Kuich (1905–1940), SA Senior Leader
- Volker Duschner (1945–2022), fencer and teacher
- Michi Gaigg (1957), director of the L’Orfeo baroque orchestra and artistic director of the Danube festival weeks
- Robert Steiner (1969), presenter, actor, singer and entrepreneur

=== People associated with the municipality ===
- Gustav Klimt (1862–1918), painter, representative of Viennese Art Nouveau
- Richard Teschner (1879–1948), painter, graphic artist, sculptor and puppeteer, member of the Wiener Werkstätte
- Käthe Dorsch (1890–1957), actress, who owned the Dorschvilla from 1938 onwards. She is the namesake of Käthe-Dorsch-Weg in Schörfling.
